= John Dean Provincial Park =

Provincial park on Vancouver Island in British Columbia, Canada

ȽÁU,WELṈEW/John Dean Provincial Park
- IUCN category II (national park)
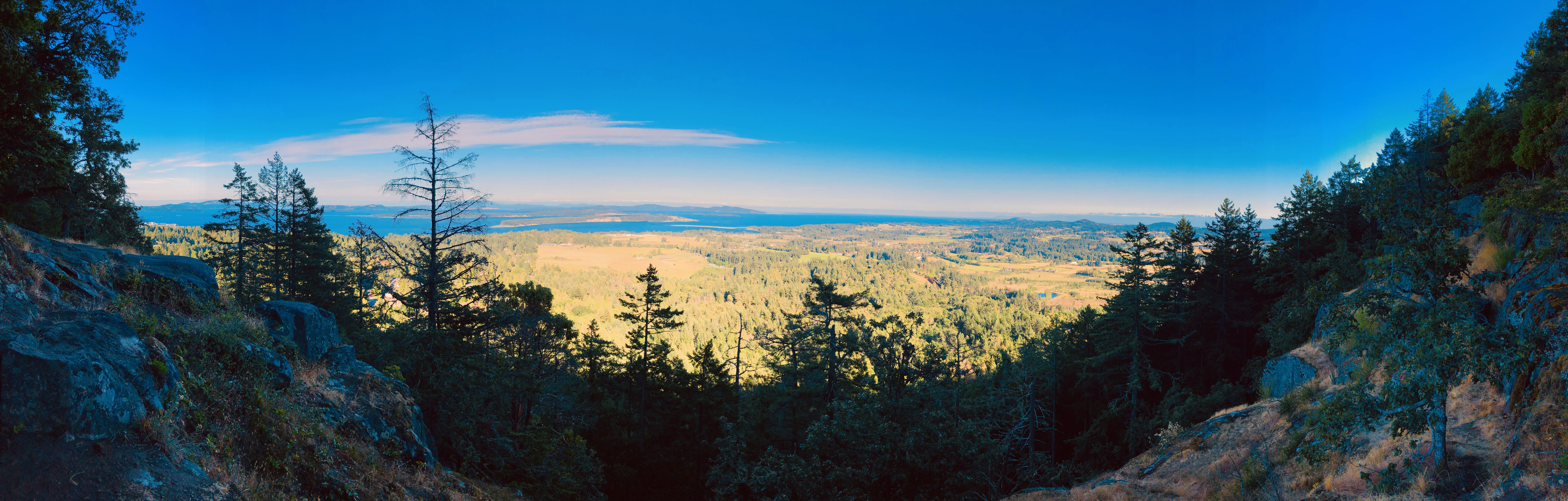
- View from Pickles Bluff

- Location within Vancouver Island Location within British Columbia Location within Capital Regional District
- Interactive map of ȽÁU,WELṈEW/John Dean Provincial Park
- Location: Central Saanich & North Saanich, British Columbia, Canada
- Coordinates: 48°36′44″N 123°26′53″W
- Area: 174 ha (430 acres)
- Established: December 9, 1921
- Governing body: BC Parks

ȽÁU,WELṈEW̱/John Dean Provincial Park, formerly John Dean Provincial Park, is a small, densely vegetated provincial park (174 hectares) on the Saanich Peninsula of southern Vancouver Island, British Columbia, Canada. The park is located on and around ȽÁU,WELṈEW̱ (Mount Newton), a mountain in the traditional territory of the Wsanec First Nations, itself situated 20 km north of Victoria, the provincial capital city.

Featuring lush vegetation, the park is noted for its virgin old-growth douglas-fir and western red cedar, with large specimens up to 70 m in height (taller than the tallest tree in the UK and the tallest conifer in all of Europe) and for its rich Coastal Douglas-Fir ecosystem, little of which remains on southern Vancouver Island. About a quarter of the old-growth forest to the north-west lies on the Cole Bay reserve of the Pauquachin First Nation.

== Geography ==
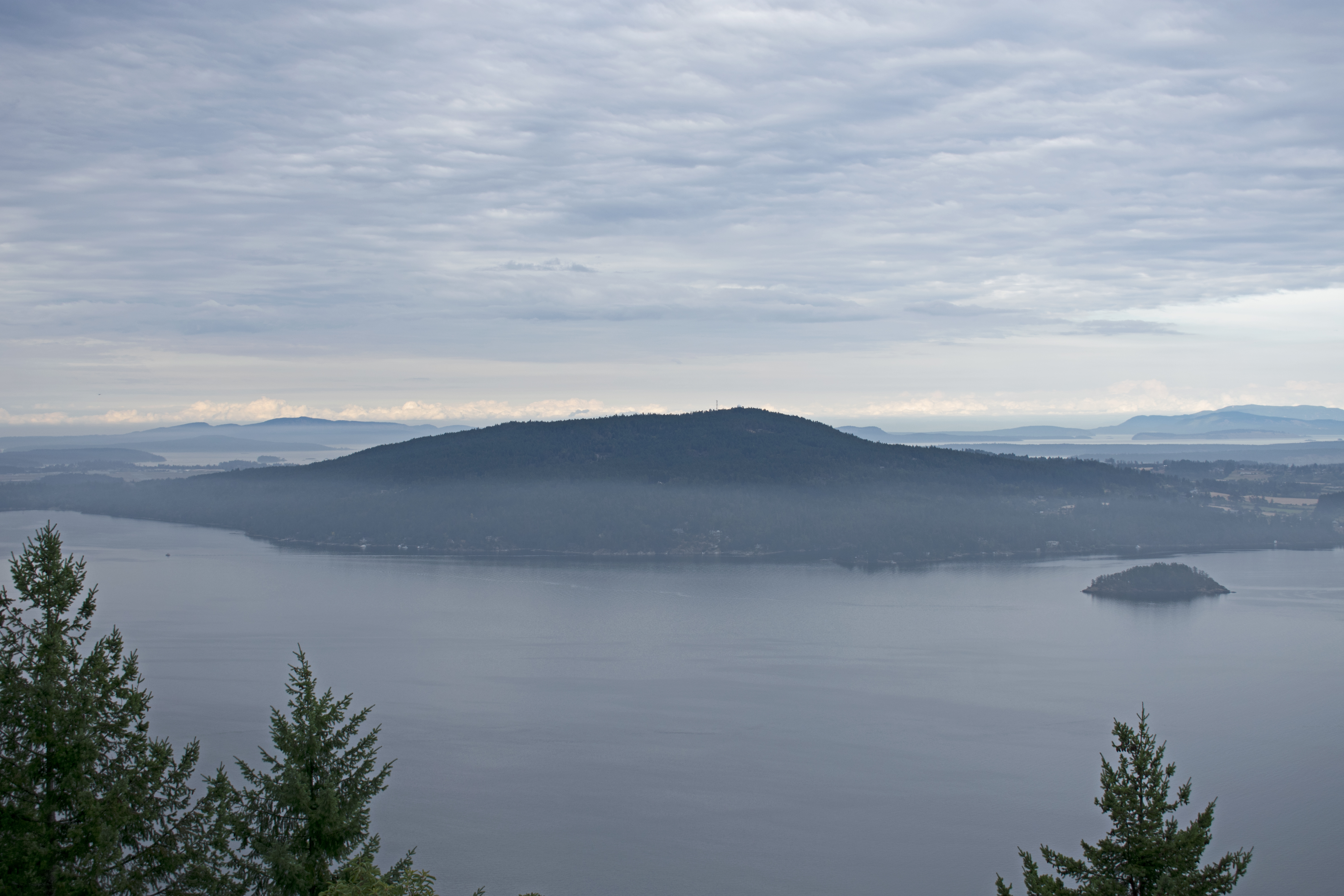
Mount Newton seen across Saanich Inlet

The park itself, and the larger old-growth forest which contains the park, are bounded by Saanich Inlet to the west, the affluent community of Dean Park bounds portions of the forest on the east slope, the remainder is bounded on the south and southeast by low-density residential and mixed-use agriculture, some pockets under the auspices of the Canadian Agricultural Land Reserve.

The peninsula is only about 8 km wide where it straddles the park, and scenic views of Saanich Inlet to the west and of Cordova Channel, to the east are obtainable from marked vantage points.

Mount Newton itself straddles North and Central Saanich, neighbouring municipalities of the Capital Regional District. The Greater Victoria region is known for its mild climate, tourism, government and technology sectors, ferry service to the Lower Mainland, and for the naval base CFB Esquimalt. The small but busy Victoria International Airport lies a short distance to the northeast, which, in addition to commercial traffic, is home to the 443 Maritime Helicopter Squadron and is frequented by small planes, readily observed in the surrounding areas.

== History ==
In First Nations culture, the top of the mountain was called ȽÁU,WELṈEW̱, the high land that enabled them to survive the great flood. They anchored their canoe with a western red cedar rope to a tall arbutus tree at the summit. ȽÁU,WELNEW is best pronounced as Tlay-will-nook.

In the early 1900s, pioneer John Dean (1850–1943) erected a cabin close to what is now the centre of the park. Dean donated the original land which became the park in 1921, which was later expanded. Dean's cabin was razed in 1957, but the foundation and much of the building material remains, and the site is marked with a signpost. He is described as an eccentric who had been the mayor of Rossland and a life-long bachelor. He was interred at Ross Bay Cemetery.

=== Radar history ===
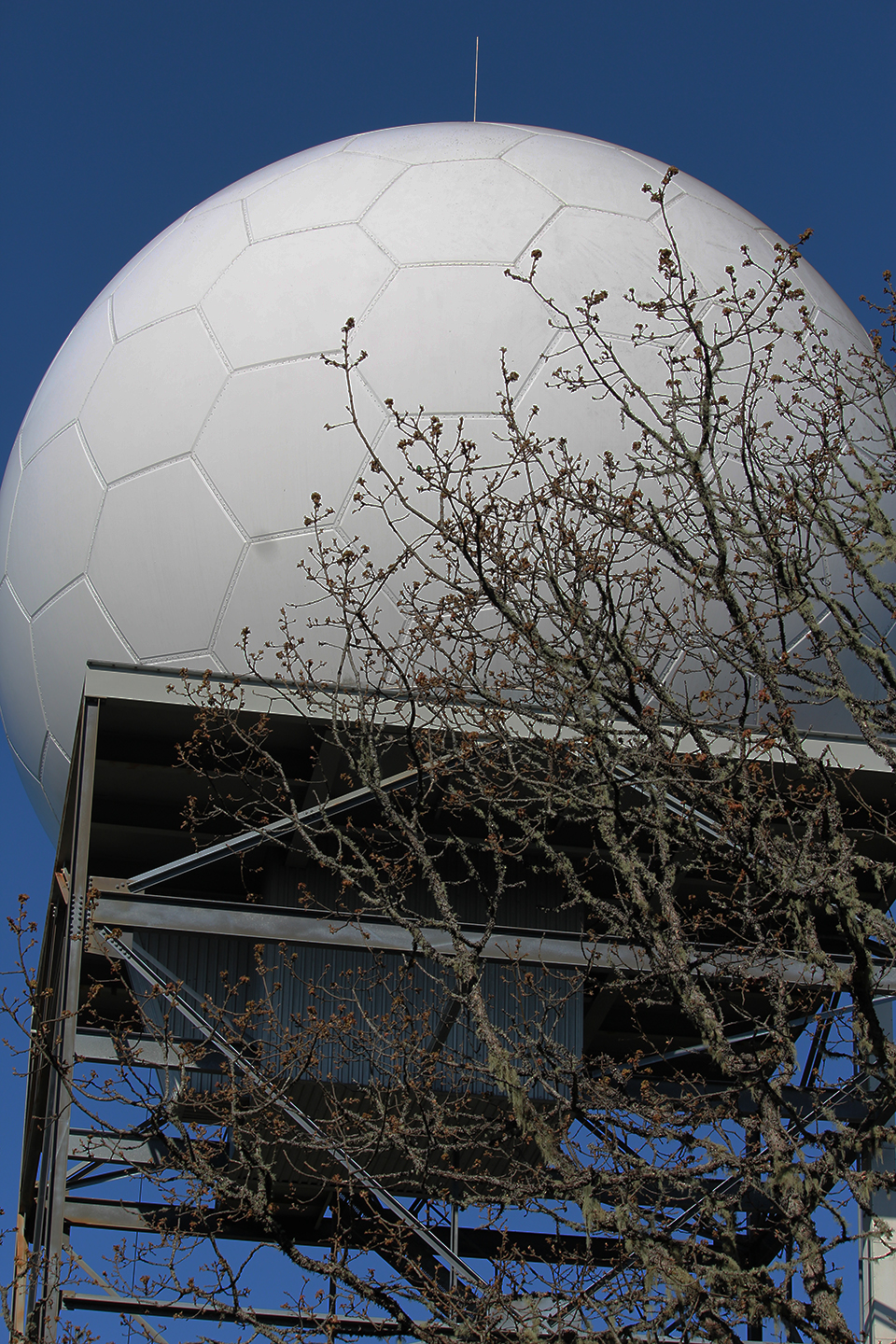
The traffic control radar located at the summit of Mount Newton in John Dean Provincial Park.

At the summit of the mountain is a large Doppler radar that can be seen from most elevated points in Victoria, British Columbia. It is referred to as the "big soccer ball" by citizens due to the appearance of its radome, but is in fact situated upon a massive foundation tower with top at 25 metres above the ground. The radar is owned and operated by Nav Canada and is used for air traffic control, and is commonly mistaken to be a weather radar.

During the mid-1980s, Transport Canada purchased 39 new state of the art radar tower systems, which would provide complete aerial surveillance over Canada; it was a priority of national importance. Soon after, a Site Selection Committee was created to locate a site that met certain criteria for the Victoria International Airport.

Many sites were considered but the Mount Newton site was the only one which met all the operational criteria; thus the Ministry of Transportation gave approval in 1982. The coverage area predicted was based on analysis of topographical maps. “Any potential impact by trees or foliage will be evaluated by flight checking after construction.”

Raytheon Canada Ltd. received the contract to construct ready turnkey installations, using a standard tower configuration of a 25 metres height. After the tower was completed in November 1989, on February 23, 1990, Raytheon Canada Ltd. and Transport Canada conducted flight checks. The checks verified that the equipment was functioning to specifications, and the facility was handed over to Transport Canada. The facility is now located in a fenced off plot of land adjacent to the parking lot, accessible by a locked gate and gravel road.

A second radar is located downwards from the first, it is a rotating parabolic radar owned and operated by the Canadian Coast Guard and is used for transmitting high frequency signals between Coast Guard ships and commercial/leisure vessels in emergencies.

=== Recent history ===
In May 2019, John Dean Provincial Park was renamed ȽÁU,WELṈEW̱/John Dean Provincial Park.

== Ecology ==
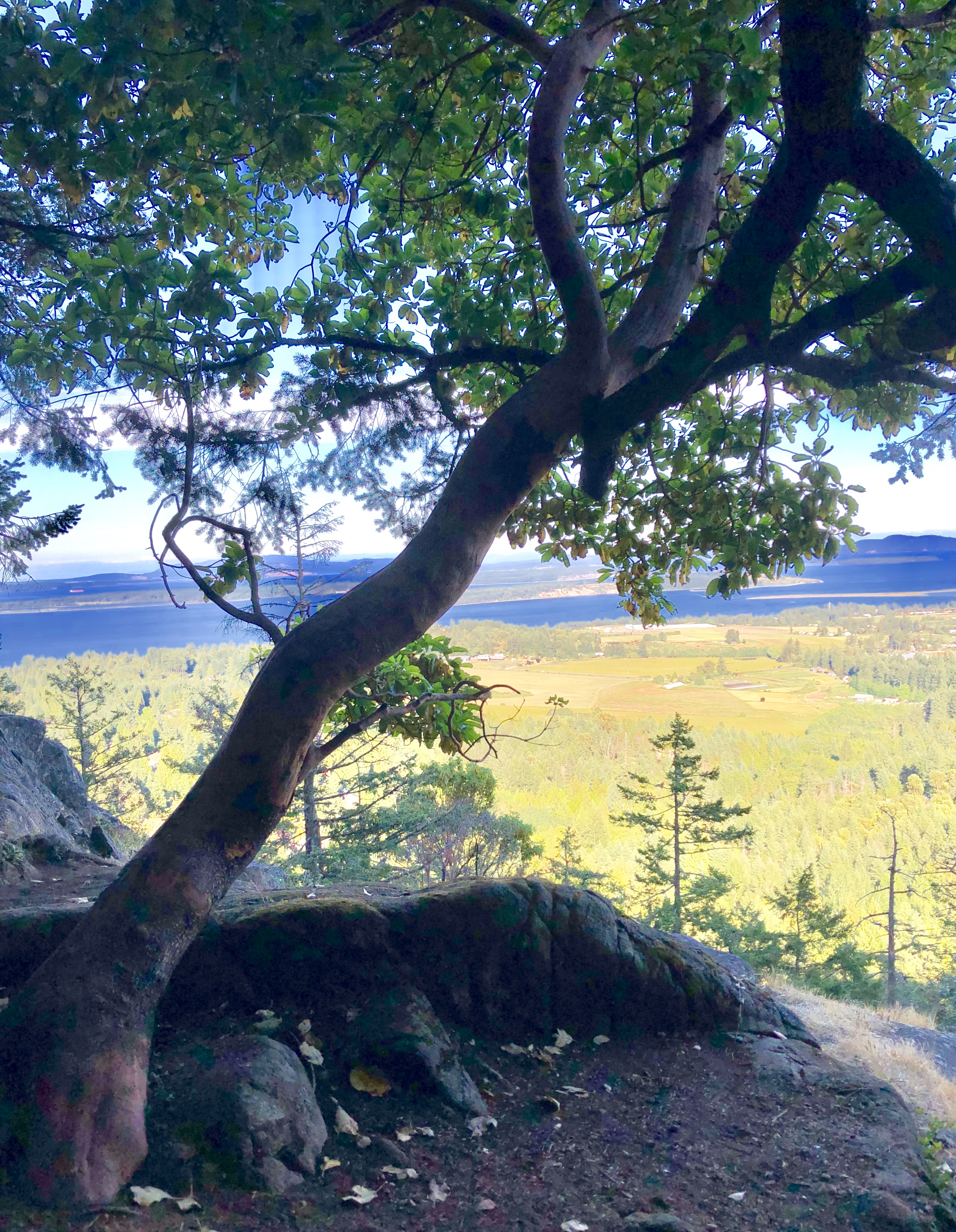
Arbutus Tree at ȽÁU,WELṈEW̱/John Dean Provincial Park

John Dean Provincial Park contains virgin old-growth Douglas fir (P. menziesii var. menziesii) and western red cedar (Thuja plicata), whereas almost all other spots contain second growth or less.

The tree species in the park include: western red cedar, coast Douglas fir, red alder, one shore pine, grand fir, arbutus, Garry oak, some western hemlock (most abundant off the Valley Mist Trail), bigleaf maple, the occasional Pacific yew, some small black cottonwood, and shrub-like Pacific serviceberry, cherries (genus Prunus), and a few willows (genus Salix). The higher up the mountain, the trees change from a cedar-fir habitat to an oak-arbutus-fir forest.

The park also contains rare native wildflowers, the pileated woodpecker (Dryocopus pileatus), and the increasingly endangered Garry oak (Quercus garryana var. garryana).

The tallest tree, a Douglas fir just off the Valley Mist Trail is an impressive 70.9 m tall, and is the tallest tree in the municipality of North Saanich (the runner up is 69.9 m tall, very close by). 73% of Vancouver Island's productive old-growth forests have been logged, 87% on southern Vancouver Island, and 99% of the coastal Douglas fir biogeoclimatic zone (see biogeoclimatic zones of British Columbia.) This species of Douglas fir is currently the second tallest tree in Canada (93.27 metres, after a 96-metre Sitka spruce, the Carmanah Giant.)

The Douglas fir, at a record height of 126.5 m, used to be the second tallest tree in the world, taller than the redwoods, only exceeded by the mountain ash of Australia, at a record height of 150 m.

The trees in the park, though, in no way set a record when compared to the giants of the wetter, better tree growing habitat of the west side of Vancouver Island, but are parts of the endangered dry old-growth Douglas fir habitat, of which only 1% remains since the onset of the industrial age.

== Facilities ==
There are approximately 6 km of well-marked hiking trails maintained by an organization of local citizens called the Friends of John Dean Park. The terrain is hilly, but does not demand hiking gear in dry conditions, which prevail in the late spring and summer. There are several lookout areas along these trails where hikers can get views of the Saanich Peninsula and the Saanich Inlet.

The park's main entrance is closed to vehicle traffic from November to March. The off season is persistently wet and overcast, though the rain is often mild; if the temperature dips, heavy snowfall is not unusual in December and January.
