= List of historic places in the Capital Regional District =

This is a list of historic places in the Capital Regional District, British Columbia (excluding the City of Victoria) entered on the Canadian Register of Historic Places, whether they are designated federally, provincially or municipally. For a list of historic places in the City of Victoria refer to the List of historic places in Victoria, British Columbia.

Name	Address	Coordinates	Government recognition (CRHP №)	Wikidata ID	Image
Light Tower	Carmanah Point; Clo-oose BC	48°36′42″N 124°45′05″W	Federal (10650)		More images
Belmont Road Main Gatehouse, Royal Roads University formerly Royal Roads Military College	13 College Dr Victoria, BC V9C, Canada Hatley Park National Historic Site; Colwood BC	48°26′13″N 123°27′40″W	Federal (2840)		More images
Cole Island	Cole Island; Colwood BC	48°27′13″N 123°27′04″W	British Columbia (12074)		Upload Photo
Cow Barn and Dairy RR6	Hatley Park National Historic Site; Colwood BC	48°25′49″N 123°28′30″W	Federal (2841)		More images
Defence Electric Light Number 1	Fort Rodd Hill Road; Colwood BC	48°25′55″N 123°27′00″W	Federal (4295)		More images
Fisgard Lighthouse and Dwelling	603 Fort Rodd Hill Road; Colwood BC	48°25′49″N 123°26′51″W	Federal (1146, (1253), British Columbia (20335)		More images
Fort Rodd Hill National Historic Site of Canada	603 Fort Rodd Hill Road; Colwood BC	48°25′57″N 123°27′00″W	Federal (13469)		
Fort Rodd Hill National Historic Site, Lower Battery, Casemate Barracks (6 Buildings)	Colwood BC	48°25′55″N 123°27′00″W	Federal (4296)		More images
Fort Rodd Hill, Battery Commander’s Post	Fort Rodd Hill Road; Colwood BC	48°25′55″N 123°27′00″W	Federal (4348)		More images
Fort Rodd Hill, Canteen	Fort Rodd Hill Road; Colwood BC	48°25′55″N 123°27′00″W	Federal (4346)		More images
Fortress Plotting Room	Fort Rodd Hill Road; Colwood BC	48°25′55″N 123°27′00″W	Federal (4292)		More images
Gatehouse Lodge	Hatley Park National Historic Site; Colwood BC	48°26′20″N 123°28′48″W	Federal (11288)		Upload Photo
Grant Block, Building 24, Royal Roads University formerly Royal Roads Military College	Hatley Park National Historic Site; Colwood BC	48°26′00″N 123°28′59″W	Federal (3664)		More images
Guardhouse, Lower Battery	Fort Rodd Hill Road; Colwood BC	48°25′55″N 123°27′00″W	Federal (4286)		More images
Guardhouse, Upper Battery	Fort Rodd Hill Road; Colwood BC	48°25′55″N 123°27′00″W	Federal (4283)		More images
Gun Emplacement and Magazine, Lower Battery	Fort Rodd Hill Road; Colwood BC	48°26′N 123°29′W	Federal (4290)		More images
Gun Emplacement and Magazine, Upper Battery	Fort Rodd Hill Road; Colwood BC	48°26′N 123°29′W	Federal (4289)		More images
Gun Emplacement, Magazine and Directors Tower, Belmont Battery Classified Federal Heritage Building	Fort Rodd Hill Road; Colwood BC		Federal (3145)		More images
Gymnasium RR22, Royal Roads University formerly Royal Roads Military College	Hatley Park National Historic Site; Colwood BC	48°25′49″N 123°28′30″W	Federal (2844)		More images
Hatley Park National Historic Site / Former Royal Roads Military College/Royal Roads University	2005 Sooke Road; Colwood BC	48°26′06″N 123°28′23″W	Federal (15749, (7944)		Upload Photo
Journey's End (House)	Ocean Boulevard; Colwood BC	48°26′07″N 123°27′04″W	Federal (4375)		Upload Photo
Nixon Block RR24A, Royal Roads University formerly Royal Roads Military College	Hatley Park National Historic Site; Colwood BC	48°25′49″N 123°28′30″W	Federal (2843)		More images
Searchlight Engine Room	603, Fort Rodd Hill Road; Colwood BC	48°25′55″N 123°27′00″W	Federal (4279)		More images
Searchlight N° 7	Fort Rodd Hill Road; Colwood BC	48°25′55″N 123°27′00″W	Federal (4281)		More images
Stable / Garage RR4 Royal Roads University formerly Royal Roads Military College	Hatley Park National Historic Site; Colwood BC	48°25′49″N 123°28′30″W	Federal (2842)		More images
Swimming Pool RR22A Royal Roads University formerly Royal Roads Military College	Hatley Park National Historic Site; Colwood BC	48°25′49″N 123°28′30″W	Federal (2845)		Upload Photo
Warrant Officer's Quarters	Fort Rodd Hill Road; Colwood BC	48°25′55″N 123°27′00″W	Federal (4277)		More images
Building 34 Nelles Block	Esquimalt BC	48°26′11″N 123°25′05″W	Federal (10070)		Upload Photo
Building D1 Base Commander’s Residence	Esquimalt BC	48°25′48″N 123°26′06″W	Federal (3983)		Upload Photo
Building D101 Admiral’s Residence	Hospital Rd Dockyard; Esquimalt BC	48°25′51″N 123°26′15″W	Federal (3147)		Upload Photo
Building D109 Former Sail Loft and Oil Stores	Esquimalt BC	48°25′48″N 123°26′06″W	Federal (4064)		Upload Photo
Building D175 Drydock Pumphouse	Esquimalt BC	48°25′48″N 123°26′06″W	Federal (2792)		Upload Photo
Building D211 Clothing and Receiving Stores	Esquimalt BC	48°25′48″N 123°26′06″W	Federal (3980)		More images
Building D214 Dockyard Guardhouse	Esquimalt BC	48°25′48″N 123°26′06″W	Federal (2793)		More images
Building D26 Former Royal Navy Prison	Esquimalt BC	48°25′48″N 123°26′06″W	Federal (3984)		More images
Building D38 Stone Frigate	Esquimalt BC	48°25′48″N 123°26′06″W	Federal (4341)		More images
Building D51 Factory	Esquimalt BC	48°25′48″N 123°26′06″W	Federal (3982)		Upload Photo
Building D70 Dockyard Main Office	Esquimalt BC	48°25′48″N 123°26′06″W	Federal (2785)		More images
Building D75-D76 Rum and Salt Meats Stores	Esquimalt BC	48°25′48″N 123°26′06″W	Federal (3978)		More images
Building D77 Creery Building Former Ordnance Stores	Esquimalt BC	48°26′18″N 123°25′48″W	Federal (3979)		More images
Building D80, former Cordage / Furniture Stores Recognized Federal Heritage Building	Esquimalt BC	48°25′48″N 123°26′06″W	Federal (3981)		More images
CFB Esquimalt, Bickford Tower, Building D118	Esquimalt BC	48°25′48″N 123°26′06″W	Federal (3900)		Upload Photo
CFB Esquimalt, Dockyard, Electrical Shop Building, D141	Esquimalt BC	48°25′48″N 123°26′06″W	Federal (3895)		Upload Photo
CFB Esquimalt, Dockyards, Aldergrove Building, D199	Esquimalt BC		Federal (3893)		More images
Communications School, Building 67	Esquimalt BC	48°25′48″N 123°26′06″W	Federal (3988)		More images
Esquimalt Naval Sites National Historic Site of Canada	Esquimalt BC	48°26′02″N 123°26′02″W	Federal (12301)		More images
Former Armament Artificer's and Sergeant's Quarters, Building 522	Esquimalt BC	48°26′00″N 123°25′59″W	Federal (3986)		More images
Former Married Privates' Quarters, Building 523	Esquimalt BC	48°26′00″N 123°25′59″W	Federal (3985)		More images
Former Offices of the Officer-in-Charge	CFB Esquimalt; Esquimalt BC	48°25′48″N 123°26′06″W	Federal (3991)		More images
Guard House Building 38	Esquimalt BC	48°26′N 123°29′W	Federal (2652)		Upload Photo
Gun Emplacement, Building 578	Signal Hill; Esquimalt BC		Federal (4754)		Upload Photo
Gunnery School, former Building 50	Esquimalt BC	48°25′48″N 123°26′06″W	Federal (3990)		More images
Naden Museum Square, Building 20	Esquimalt BC	48°26′11″N 123°25′16″W	Federal (10131)		More images
Naden Museum Square, Building 37	Esquimalt BC	48°26′09″N 123°25′19″W	Federal (10143)		More images
Naden, Building Nos. 33, 33A, 33B Former Drill Hall	Esquimalt BC	48°25′48″N 123°26′06″W	Federal (3989)		More images
Naden, Museum Square, Building No. 35	Esquimalt BC	48°25′48″N 123°26′06″W	Federal (3913)		More images
Protestant Chapel Building 39	Esquimalt BC	48°25′48″N 123°26′06″W	Federal (3914)		More images
Pump House	825 Admirals Road; Esquimalt BC	48°26′14″N 123°25′29″W	Federal (10158)		Upload Photo
Radar Training Building	Esquimalt BC	48°26′23″N 123°24′58″W	Federal (13215)		Upload Photo
Royal Garrison Artillery Barracks’ Blocks, Building 1075	Esquimalt BC	48°25′48″N 123°26′06″W	Federal (2829)		Upload Photo
Shipwrights' Shed / Spar Shed, Building D113	Esquimalt BC	48°25′48″N 123°26′06″W	Federal (4477)		More images
Signal Hill No. 508	Esquimalt BC		Federal (3987)		More images
Stores / Museum Warehouse, Building 29	Esquimalt BC	48°25′48″N 123°26′06″W	Federal (3915)		More images
Torpedo School, former Building 2	Esquimalt BC		Federal (6194)		More images
Trades Training Building	Esquimalt BC	48°26′23″N 123°24′58″W	Federal (13176)		Upload Photo
Transformer House	825 Admirals Road; Esquimalt BC	48°26′14″N 123°25′27″W	Federal (10224)		Upload Photo
Veterans' Cemetery Chapel	Esquimalt BC	48°26′28″N 123°24′47″W	Federal (4366)		Upload Photo
Warehouse Building D85	Esquimalt BC	48°25′48″N 123°26′06″W	Federal (4274)		More images
Work Point Barracks No. 1004	Esquimalt BC	48°25′48″N 123°26′06″W	Federal (2796)		More images
Work Point Barracks No. 1020	Esquimalt BC	48°25′48″N 123°26′06″W	Federal (2797)		More images
Work Point Guard House	Esquimalt BC	48°25′34″N 123°23′51″W	Federal (21058)		More images
Building D83 Oil Stores	Esquimalt BC	48°25′48″N 123°26′06″W	Federal (2794)		More images
Lighttower	off southern tip of Vancouver Island; Metchosin BC	48°17′53″N 123°31′53″W	Federal (4744)		
Denham Till Park and Residence	744 Birch Road; North Saanich BC	48°40′48″N 123°28′05″W	North Saanich municipality (11383)		More images
Glamorgan Farm	1805 Glamorgan Road; North Saanich BC	48°39′30″N 123°25′37″W	North Saanich municipality (11359)		Upload Photo
Holy Trinity Church	1319 Mills Road; North Saanich BC	48°39′19″N 123°26′45″W	North Saanich municipality (11356)		More images
Holy Trinity Cemetery	1319 Mills Road; North Saanich BC	48°39′17″N 123°26′42″W	North Saanich municipality (11357)		More images
Horth Residence	498 Downey Road; North Saanich BC	48°40′26″N 123°28′44″W	North Saanich municipality (11361)		More images
Lillian Hoffar Park	10563 McDonald Park Road; North Saanich BC	48°40′10″N 123°24′54″W	North Saanich municipality (11384)		More images
Lillian Hoffar Western Red Cedar	10563 McDonald Park Road; North Saanich BC	48°40′12″N 123°24′58″W	North Saanich municipality (11385)		Upload Photo
Mary Spencer Residence	8916 Marshall Road; North Saanich BC	48°37′26″N 123°25′01″W	North Saanich municipality (11358)		Upload Photo
Nymph Point Park	1900 block Marina Way; North Saanich BC	48°40′29″N 123°25′01″W	North Saanich municipality (11362)		More images
R.O. Bull Memorial Park	400-block Wain Road; North Saanich BC	48°40′36″N 123°28′48″W	North Saanich municipality (11387)		More images
The White House	9774 West Saanich Road; North Saanich BC	48°38′55″N 123°27′14″W	North Saanich municipality (11360)		More images
Wain Park	800-block Wain Road; North Saanich BC	48°40′41″N 123°27′43″W	North Saanich municipality (11386)		More images
1150 Monterey Avenue	1150 Monterey Avenue; Oak Bay BC	48°25′21″N 123°18′54″W	Oak Bay municipality (6769)		More images
1241 Monterey Avenue	1241 Monterey Avenue; Oak Bay BC	48°25′25″N 123°18′50″W	Oak Bay municipality (6443)		More images
151 Sunny Lane	151 Sunny Lane; Oak Bay BC	48°24′45″N 123°19′12″W	Oak Bay municipality (18739)		Upload Photo
1512 Beach Drive	1512 Beach Drive; Oak Bay BC	48°25′36″N 123°18′28″W	Oak Bay municipality (20005)		Upload Photo
1590 York Place	1590 York Place; Oak Bay BC	48°25′40″N 123°18′39″W	Oak Bay municipality (6535)		Upload Photo
1931 Bowker Place	1931 Bowker Place; Oak Bay BC	48°25′51″N 123°18′22″W	Oak Bay municipality (18738)		More images
210 Denison Road	210 Denison Road; Oak Bay BC	48°24′43″N 123°19′23″W	Oak Bay municipality (18582)		Upload Photo
2264 Windsor Road	2264 Windsor Road; Oak Bay BC	48°25′20″N 123°18′50″W	Oak Bay municipality (17842)		Upload Photo
235 Denison Road	235 Denison Road; Oak Bay BC	48°24′46″N 123°19′23″W	Oak Bay municipality (16189)		Upload Photo
2450 Windsor Road	2450 Windsor Road; Oak Bay BC	48°25′22″N 123°18′32″W	Oak Bay municipality (17843)		Upload Photo
2753 Somass Drive	2753 Somass Drive; Oak Bay BC	48°25′46″N 123°18′22″W	Oak Bay municipality (17841)		More images
318 Newport Avenue	318 Newport Avenue; Oak Bay BC	48°24′41″N 123°18′11″W	Oak Bay municipality (18282)		Upload Photo
3225 Beach Drive	3225 Beach Drive; Oak Bay BC	48°26′48″N 123°17′38″W	Oak Bay municipality (16188)		Upload Photo
33 Sylvan Lane	33 Sylvan Lane; Oak Bay BC	48°24′49″N 123°19′19″W	Oak Bay municipality (18396)		Upload Photo
825 Foul Bay Road	825 Foul Bay Road; Oak Bay BC	48°25′09″N 123°19′23″W	Oak Bay municipality (6738)		More images
929 Island Road	929 Island Road; Oak Bay BC	48°25′09″N 123°18′25″W	Oak Bay municipality (6741)		Upload Photo
941 Victoria Avenue	941 Victoria Avenue; Oak Bay BC	48°25′11″N 123°19′05″W	Oak Bay municipality (18405)		More images
Balgreggan	3000 Rutland Road; Oak Bay BC	48°26′38″N 123°17′38″W	Oak Bay municipality (6447)		Upload Photo
Bide-A-Wee House	1538 Beach Drive; Oak Bay BC	48°26′N 123°19′W	Oak Bay municipality (2347)		Upload Photo
Bleakney House	516 Newport Avenue; Oak Bay BC	48°24′50″N 123°18′14″W	Oak Bay municipality (6446)		Upload Photo
Bowden House	2809 Burdick Avenue; Oak Bay BC	48°26′32″N 123°18′36″W	Oak Bay municipality (6448)		Upload Photo
The Bowker Gates	2200 block of Beach Drive; Oak Bay BC	48°26′03″N 123°18′19″W	Oak Bay municipality (20045)		Upload Photo
Bryn-Y-Mor	380 Newport Avenue; Oak Bay BC	48°24′44″N 123°18′14″W	Oak Bay municipality (18283)		Upload Photo
Castle Block	2188 Oak Bay Avenue; Oak Bay BC	48°25′36″N 123°18′58″W	Oak Bay municipality (6715)		Upload Photo
Charlewood House	2664 Orchard Avenue; Oak Bay BC	48°25′21″N 123°18′14″W	Oak Bay municipality (6618)		Upload Photo
Chinese Cemetery at Harling Point National Historic Site of Canada	Crescent Road and Penzance Street; Oak Bay BC	48°24′24″N 123°19′23″W	Federal (9167)		More images
Clark House	1086 St. Louis Street; Oak Bay BC	48°25′16″N 123°18′22″W	Oak Bay municipality (6688)		Upload Photo
Dainhurst	508 Island Road; Oak Bay BC	48°24′49″N 123°18′18″W	Oak Bay municipality (18285)		Upload Photo
Eastman House	2087 Byron Street; Oak Bay BC	48°25′40″N 123°19′12″W	Oak Bay municipality (6440)		More images
Elliot House	1255 Victoria Avenue; Oak Bay BC	48°25′26″N 123°19′05″W	Oak Bay municipality (6441)		More images
Fanny Shipwreck	Off Alpha Islet, north of Discovery Island; Oak Bay BC	48°26′00″N 123°13′55″W	British Columbia (19305)		Upload Photo
Gilbert House	2090 Byron Street; Oak Bay BC	48°25′42″N 123°19′12″W	Oak Bay municipality (6445)		More images
Glenlyon Norfolk School	1701 Beach Drive; Oak Bay BC	48°26′N 123°19′W	Oak Bay municipality (2345)		Upload Photo
Grayson House	2483 Cranmore Road; Oak Bay BC	48°25′52″N 123°18′43″W	Oak Bay municipality (6536)		More images
Hambley House	2086 Byron Street; Oak Bay BC	48°25′42″N 123°19′12″W	Oak Bay municipality (6714)		Upload Photo
Hamilton-Smith House	2753 Cavendish Avenue; Oak Bay BC	48°25′56″N 123°18′18″W	Oak Bay municipality (6442)		More images
Harman House	1586 York Place; Oak Bay BC	48°26′N 123°19′W	Oak Bay municipality (2348)		Upload Photo
Henry Burt-Smith House	1193 Beach Drive; Oak Bay BC	48°25′13″N 123°18′00″W	Oak Bay municipality (6449)		Upload Photo
Hinton House	1029 Beach Drive; Oak Bay BC	48°25′02″N 123°17′49″W	Oak Bay municipality (6712)		Upload Photo
Ince	2021 McNeill Avenue; Oak Bay BC	48°25′12″N 123°19′23″W	Oak Bay municipality (18281)		More images
James Tait House	2435 Musgrave Street; Oak Bay BC	48°26′14″N 123°18′29″W	Oak Bay municipality (6740)		More images
Jarvis House	1050 St. Patrick Street; Oak Bay BC	48°25′16″N 123°18′43″W	Oak Bay municipality (6690)		More images
Johnston House	1275 St. David Street; Oak Bay BC	48°25′26″N 123°18′36″W	Oak Bay municipality (6687)		Upload Photo
Jones House	599 Island Road; Oak Bay BC	48°24′52″N 123°18′25″W	Oak Bay municipality (6767)		Upload Photo
Kildonan	931 Foul Bay Road; Oak Bay BC	48°25′18″N 123°19′19″W	Oak Bay municipality (18676)		Upload Photo
Kingsmount	305 Denison Road; Oak Bay BC	48°24′52″N 123°19′19″W	Oak Bay municipality (6742)		Upload Photo
Kirkland	2519 Currie Road; Oak Bay BC	48°25′18″N 123°18′22″W	Oak Bay municipality (6771)		Upload Photo
Little-Oaks	3165 Tarn Place; Oak Bay BC	48°26′30″N 123°17′31″W	Oak Bay municipality (18408)		Upload Photo
Logan Mayhew House	3515 Beach Drive; Oak Bay BC	48°27′10″N 123°18′00″W	Oak Bay municipality (15697)		Upload Photo
Lovatt House	2030 Milton Street; Oak Bay BC		Oak Bay municipality (6444)		Upload Photo
Margaret Marsh House	2493 Currie Road; Oak Bay BC	48°25′16″N 123°18′25″W	Oak Bay municipality (6770)		Upload Photo
Oak Bay United Church	2095 Granite Street; Oak Bay BC	48°25′29″N 123°19′12″W	Oak Bay municipality (18286)		More images
Oliver House	953 St. Patrick Street; Oak Bay BC	48°25′11″N 123°18′40″W	Oak Bay municipality (6689)		More images
Oxford Cottage	947 Foul Bay Road; Oak Bay BC	48°25′24″N 123°19′16″W	Oak Bay municipality (6739)		Upload Photo
Robin Oak	1265 Roslyn Road; Oak Bay BC	48°25′26″N 123°19′01″W	Oak Bay municipality (6505)		More images
Rowland Powell House	1684 Yale Street; Oak Bay BC	48°25′44″N 123°19′05″W	Oak Bay municipality (6713)		More images
Tapley House	2138 Central Avenue; Oak Bay BC	48°25′01″N 123°19′08″W	Oak Bay municipality (2346)		Upload Photo
Tod House	2564 Heron Street; Oak Bay BC	48°26′16″N 123°18′22″W	Oak Bay municipality (2350)		More images
Trial Islands Lighthouse	Trial Islands; Oak Bay BC	48°23′42″N 123°18′18″W	Federal (20834)		
Turner House	3110 Weald Road; Oak Bay BC	48°26′43″N 123°18′18″W	Oak Bay municipality (6691)		Upload Photo
Valrose	3125 Uplands Road; Oak Bay BC	48°26′46″N 123°18′28″W	Oak Bay municipality (6504)		Upload Photo
Victoria Golf Club	1110 Beach Drive; Oak Bay BC	48°24′53″N 123°18′00″W	Oak Bay municipality (18284)		Upload Photo
William Henry Noble House	2224 Hampshire Terrace; Oak Bay BC	48°25′31″N 123°18′54″W	Oak Bay municipality (6716)		Upload Photo
Woodlands	1668 Hampshire Road; Oak Bay BC	48°25′50″N 123°18′58″W	Oak Bay municipality (6534)		More images
998 Gorge Road West	998 Gorge Road West; Saanich BC	48°27′13″N 123°25′12″W	Saanich municipality (3694)		Upload Photo
Army Huts, University of Victoria	3800 Finnerty Road; Saanich BC	48°28′06″N 123°18′40″W	Saanich municipality (1933)		Upload Photo
Brown Residence	1210 Tattersall Drive; Saanich BC	48°27′29″N 123°21′22″W	Saanich municipality (1797)		More images
Butchart Gardens National Historic Site of Canada	800 Benvenuto Drive; Central Saanich BC	48°33′49″N 123°28′08″W	Federal (7821)		More images
Captain Walker Residence	3808 Heritage Lane; Saanich BC	48°27′54″N 123°24′47″W	Saanich municipality (1795)		Upload Photo
Cedar Hill School	3861 Cedar Hill Cross Road; Saanich BC	48°27′50″N 123°20′28″W	Saanich municipality (1796)		More images
Cedar Hill School Manual Training Hall	3851 Cedar Hill Cross Road; Saanich BC	48°27′50″N 123°20′24″W	Saanich municipality (1794)		More images
Claxton Residence	3501 Cedar Hill Road; Saanich BC	48°27′27″N 123°20′20″W	Saanich municipality (3692)		More images
Clovelly	1196 Clovelly Terrace; Saanich BC	48°27′22″N 123°21′23″W	Saanich municipality (3697)		More images
Craigflower Schoolhouse	2755 Admirals Road; Saanich BC	48°27′09″N 123°25′19″W	British Columbia (1449)		
Dodd House	4139 Lambrick Way; Saanich BC	48°28′41″N 123°19′34″W	Saanich municipality (1790)		Upload Photo
Dominion Astrophysical Observatory	5071 West Saanich Road; Saanich BC	48°31′16″N 123°25′01″W	Federal (2966, (16392)		More images
Douglas Street Baptist Church	3277 Douglas Street; Saanich BC	48°26′56″N 123°22′23″W	Saanich municipality (1832)		More images
Duke Residence	1140 Tattersall Drive; Saanich BC	48°27′30″N 123°21′31″W	Saanich municipality (1803)		More images
Dunlop House	3100 Foul Bay Road; Saanich BC	48°26′47″N 123°19′23″W	Saanich municipality (1770)		More images
French Residence	3301 Camrose Court; Saanich BC	48°27′19″N 123°21′20″W	Saanich municipality (1761)		More images
Fullerton/McClung Residence	1861 Ferndale Road; Saanich BC	48°29′24″N 123°18′50″W	Saanich municipality (1764)		Upload Photo
Gordon Head Community Hall	4146 Tyndall Avenue; Saanich BC	48°28′42″N 123°19′23″W	Saanich municipality (1772)		Upload Photo
Goward House	2495 Arbutus Road; Saanich BC	48°28′00″N 123°17′49″W	Saanich municipality (1437)		More images
Graham Residence	452 Boleskine Road; Saanich BC	48°27′09″N 123°22′48″W	Saanich municipality (3690)		Upload Photo
Hamilton Residence	355 Gorge Road West; Saanich BC	48°26′53″N 123°24′11″W	Saanich municipality (1822)		Upload Photo
Hampton Hall	274 Hampton Road; Saanich BC	48°27′17″N 123°23′31″W	Saanich municipality (1838)		Upload Photo
Hamsterley Farm Water Tower	2485 Sinclair Road; Saanich BC	48°27′49″N 123°18′11″W	Saanich municipality (1932)		More images
High Oaks Farm	4051 Granville Avenue; Saanich BC	48°28′39″N 123°25′34″W	Saanich municipality (1836)		Upload Photo
Hill Farm	4040 Wilkinson Road; Saanich BC	48°28′30″N 123°24′50″W	Saanich municipality (3693)		Upload Photo
Holland Residence	1170 Tattersall Drive; Saanich BC	48°27′29″N 123°21′29″W	Saanich municipality (1833)		Upload Photo
Home Lumber Company Office	470 Ardersier Road; Saanich BC	48°27′02″N 123°22′44″W	Saanich municipality (1827)		Upload Photo
Horspool Residence	321 Gorge Road; Saanich BC	48°26′51″N 123°24′07″W	Saanich municipality (1837)		Upload Photo
Hutchison Residence	810 Rogers Avenue; Saanich BC	48°28′41″N 123°22′41″W	Saanich municipality (1821)		Upload Photo
Jones Residence	1911 Woodley Road; Saanich BC	48°27′07″N 123°19′30″W	Saanich municipality (1765)		Upload Photo
Kitchin Residence	3577 McInnis Rise; Saanich BC	48°27′25″N 123°21′22″W	Saanich municipality (1825)		Upload Photo
Lake Hill Pumping Station	3940 Quadra Street; Saanich BC	48°27′57″N 123°21′43″W	Saanich municipality (3695)		More images
Lambrick House	4135 Lambrick Way; Saanich BC	48°28′43″N 123°19′41″W	Saanich municipality (1767)		Upload Photo
Lee Residence	5259 Patricia Bay Highway; Saanich BC	48°31′44″N 123°23′10″W	Saanich municipality (3696)		Upload Photo
Maritime Naval Communication Centre	2260 McCoy Road; Saanich BC	48°28′09″N 123°18′50″W	Saanich municipality (1931)		More images
McRae Residence	1445 Ocean View Road; Saanich BC	48°27′05″N 123°20′38″W	Saanich municipality (1826)		Upload Photo
Mercer Residence	4366 Blenkinsop Road; Saanich BC	48°29′19″N 123°21′25″W	Saanich municipality (3691)		Upload Photo
Mount View High School	3818 Carey Road; Saanich BC	48°27′32″N 123°22′55″W	Saanich municipality (1762)		Upload Photo
Norfolk Lodge	5789 Brookhill Road; Saanich BC	48°32′22″N 123°25′16″W	Saanich municipality (1759)		Upload Photo
Old Municipal Hall	4512 West Saanich Road; Saanich BC	48°29′42″N 123°23′20″W	Saanich municipality (1823)		More images
Provincial Normal School	3100 Foul Bay Road; Saanich BC	48°26′51″N 123°19′30″W	Saanich municipality (1763)		More images
Richmond Road Streetcar Shelter	3100 Foul Bay Road; Saanich BC	48°26′51″N 123°19′34″W	Saanich municipality (1930)		More images
Rockside	1141 Palmer Road; Saanich BC	48°27′46″N 123°21′30″W	Saanich municipality (6704)		More images
Royal Oak Burial Park	4673 Falaise Drive; Saanich BC	48°30′22″N 123°22′44″W	Saanich municipality (1843)		Upload Photo
Royal Oak Community Hall	4516 West Saanich Road; Saanich BC	48°29′43″N 123°23′24″W	Saanich municipality (1824)		More images
Royal Oak Inn	4509 West Saanich Road; Saanich BC	48°29′42″N 123°23′17″W	Saanich municipality (1807)		More images
Royal Oak Schoolhouse	4525 West Saanich Road; Saanich BC	48°29′46″N 123°23′20″W	Saanich municipality (1783)		More images
Saanich Municipal Hall	770 Vernon Avenue; Saanich BC	48°27′33″N 123°22′37″W	Saanich municipality (1806)		More images
Saanich War Memorial Health Centre	4353 West Saanich Road; Saanich BC	48°29′19″N 123°23′10″W	Saanich municipality (1804)		More images
Spurgin Residence	1908 Waterloo Road; Saanich BC	48°27′04″N 123°19′34″W	Saanich municipality (1768)		Upload Photo
St. Luke's Anglican Church	3801 Cedar Hill Cross Road; Saanich BC	48°27′47″N 123°20′13″W	Saanich municipality (1757)		More images
St. Michael and All Angels' Church	4733 West Saanich Road; Saanich BC	48°30′10″N 123°24′18″W	Saanich municipality (1839)		More images
Stevens Hotel	4794 West Saanich Road; Saanich BC	48°30′16″N 123°24′29″W	Saanich municipality (1841)		Upload Photo
Stranton Lodge	1248 Burnside Road West; Saanich BC	48°28′05″N 123°25′08″W	Saanich municipality (1792)		Upload Photo
Strawberry Vale Schoolhouse	1351 Hastings Street; Saanich BC	48°28′44″N 123°25′05″W	Saanich municipality (1782)		Upload Photo
Swan Lake and Brett Trestles	NE of Saanich Road; Saanich BC	48°27′54″N 123°21′58″W	Saanich municipality (1805)		More images
The University School	3400 Richmond Road; Saanich BC	48°27′06″N 123°19′41″W	Saanich municipality (1771)		Upload Photo
Thompson Farm	5271 Old West Saanich Road; Saanich BC	48°31′25″N 123°24′36″W	Saanich municipality (1842)		Upload Photo
Thrums	1775 Barrie Road; Saanich BC	48°29′27″N 123°19′08″W	Saanich municipality (1438)		Upload Photo
Tillicum School	3155 Albina Street; Saanich BC	48°27′10″N 123°23′31″W	Saanich municipality (1834)		Upload Photo
Tolmie School	556 Boleskin Road; Saanich BC	48°27′11″N 123°22′41″W	Saanich municipality (1756)		More images
Trend House	3516 Richmond Road; Saanich BC	48°27′14″N 123°19′37″W	Saanich municipality (1769)		Upload Photo
Twin Oaks	1525 Oak Crest Drive; Saanich BC	48°27′10″N 123°20′16″W	Saanich municipality (3687)		Upload Photo
Watson House	751 Burke Street; Saanich BC	48°27′30″N 123°24′25″W	Saanich municipality (3689)		Upload Photo
Wayne Residence	1268 Tattersall Drive; Saanich BC	48°27′33″N 123°21′05″W	Saanich municipality (1828)		Upload Photo
Westward Ho	3930 Telegraph Bay Road; Saanich BC	48°27′36″N 123°17′17″W	Saanich municipality (3686)		More images
Wilkinson Road Jail	4216 Wilkinson Road; Saanich BC	48°28′59″N 123°24′36″W	Saanich municipality (1793)		Upload Photo
Wilkinson Road Methodist Church	4274 Wilkinson Road; Saanich BC	48°29′07″N 123°24′22″W	Saanich municipality (1835)		More images
Saanichton Centre for Plant Health, Building 28	8801 East Saanich Road; North Saanich BC	48°37′16″N 123°24′58″W	Federal (16526)		Upload Photo
Craigflower Manor	110 Island Highway; View Royal BC	48°27′07″N 123°25′30″W	British Columbia (1450)		
Caleb Pike Heritage Park	1589 Millstream Road; Highlands BC	48°30′31″N 123°31′24″W	Highlands municipality (20666)		Upload Photo
Caleb Pike House	1589 Millstream Road; Highlands BC	48°30′32″N 123°31′22″W	Highlands municipality (20667)		Upload Photo
The Dairy	1589 Millstream Road; Highlands BC	48°30′30″N 123°31′21″W	Highlands municipality (20739)		Upload Photo
Gregory House Replica	1589 Millstream Road; Highlands BC	48°30′32″N 123°31′21″W	Highlands municipality (20740)		Upload Photo
The Old Schoolhouse	1589 Millstream Road; Highlands BC	48°30′30″N 123°31′21″W	Highlands municipality (20737)		Upload Photo
Teacherage	1589 Millstream Road; Highlands BC	48°30′30″N 123°31′22″W	Highlands municipality (20738)		Upload Photo
Second Lake Dam	Millstream Road; Highlands BC	48°31′03″N 123°30′16″W	Highlands municipality (20741)		Upload Photo
Millstream Lake Road - Ross Durance Road	Millstream Lake Road and Ross Durance Road between Munn Road and Willis Point Road; Highlands BC	48°31′13″N 123°30′13″W	Highlands municipality (20736)		Upload Photo
Lime Kiln	1980 Millstream Road; Highlands BC	48°28′52″N 123°30′45″W	Highlands municipality (20735)		Upload Photo
Freeman King Visitor Centre	2955 Sooke Lake Road, Goldstream Provincial Park; Langford BC	48°29′04″N 123°32′59″W	British Columbia (20065)		Upload Photo
Zephyr Shipwreck	Strait of Georgia off northeast coast of Mayne Island; Mayne Island BC	48°51′44″N 123°15′18″W	British Columbia (19307)		Upload Photo
Active Pass Lighthouse	Georgina Point Road; Mayne Island BC	48°52′24″N 123°17′30″W	British Columbia (20369)		
East Point Lighthouse	Tumbo Channel Rd., eastern point of Saturna Island; Saturna Island BC	48°46′58″N 123°02′44″W	Federal (20371)		
Sheringham Point Lighthouse	Sheringham Point Road; Shirley BC	48°22′36″N 123°55′16″W	Federal (20709)		
Saanichton Centre for Plant Health, Building 28	Sidney BC	48°37′17″N 123°24′59″W	Federal (16526)		Upload Photo
Iroquois Shipwreck	Sidney Channel; Sidney BC	48°39′45″N 123°23′03″W	British Columbia (19226)		Upload Photo
