= McKenzie Bight =

Bay in British Columbia, Canada

Coordinates: 48°33′13″N 123°30′32″W

McKenzie Bight

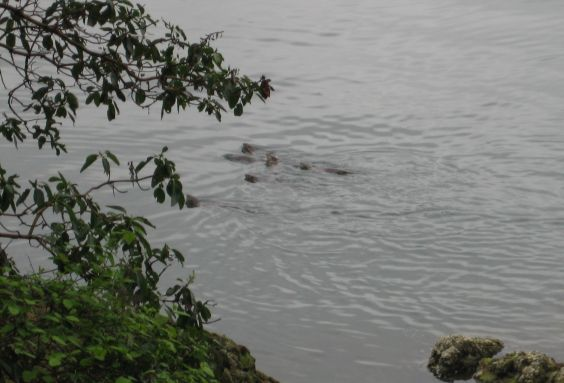
River otters feeding, May 2007

McKenzie Bight is a feature on the southeast side of Saanich Inlet in British Columbia, Canada. This bight is located in Gowlland Tod Provincial Park directly adjacent to the rural community of Willis Point. McKenzie Bight can be accessed by trail from the Mount Work parking area and trailhead on Ross-Durrance road, or via a short hike from the southern end of Mark Lane in Willis Point. Nearby is a reef which is a popular shore-dive location for scuba diving.

Occasionally river otters can be seen in the area.
