= Willis Point, British Columbia =

Coastal community of Canada

Coordinates: 48.575°N 123.484°W

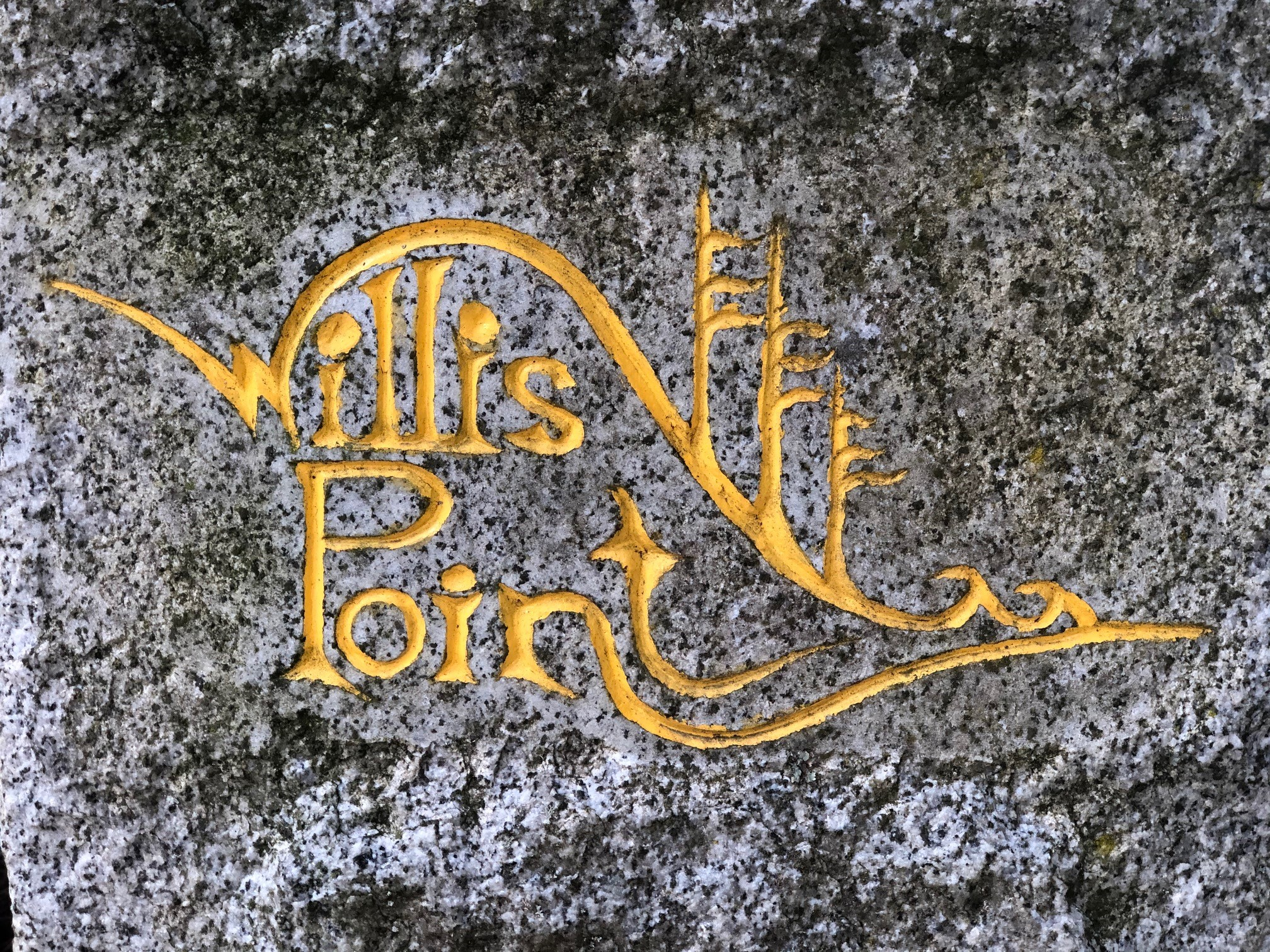
Willis Point Community Sign

Willis Point is a small, rural community in the Canadian province of British Columbia, located in the Juan de Fuca Electoral Area within the Capital Regional District and Greater Victoria. It is the only unincorporated area on the Saanich Peninsula outside of indigenous reserves, and faces north toward the Saanich Inlet. The community is bounded by the District of Highlands to the south, the District of Saanich to the southeast and the District of Central Saanich to the east. It is located west of the village of Brentwood Bay and north of the city of Victoria.

Willis Point is known for its natural beauty, including many hiking and biking trails that offer direct access to one of the last remaining enclaves of Douglas-fir forest on the Saanich Peninsula. The community is entirely surrounded by Gowlland Tod Provincial Park, Mount Work Regional Park and Durrance Lake Regional Park. The community is also a popular destination for local and international scuba divers and offers multiple shore-dive locations including the Willis Point Dive Site known for its easy entry and quiet, sheltered waters.

The population of Willis Point is estimated to be between 440 and 450 people, living in approximately 150 homes. It is home to one of Vancouver Islands' oldest volunteer fire departments, the Willis Point Volunteer Fire Department established in 1977. A history of the community has been documented and published by local historian Bill Wright.
