= Saanich Pioneer Museum =

Coordinates: 48.5972°N 123.4183°W

Formerly known as the Saanich Pioneer Museum, now known as the Log Cabin Museum it is a museum dedicated to the preservation and maintenance of the history of the Saanich Peninsula in Canada. It is located in the village of Saanichton, in Central Saanich, British Columbia.

== Description ==
The first European settlers arrived at the Saanich Peninsula in 1852. Ten farmers soon met and form an Agricultural Society in 1867 to promote what it was like farming. At the time the peninsula was separated and was called North Saanich and South Saanich. Representatives of the society were Robert Brown, George Thomas, J. T. Mcllmoyle, and Peter Emrie from North Saanich; While William Thomson, Henry Simpson, Duncan Lidgate, Thomas Michell, William Turgoose and Captain George Stephen Butler of South Saanich. For the first four years, annual Fall Exhibitions were held in different locations until 1873. By then the Society purchased five acres of land donated by Henry Simpson Who also owned the Prairie Tevern (Later replaced in 1893 by the Prairie Inn)This was the site of social gatherings. The museum was built in 1933 when the Saanich Pioneers' Society was given permission by the Fair Society to erect a log cabin on the grounds. Originally the grounds were the first Saanich Fair, which opened in 1868, thanks to ten farmers of the peninsula. In 1993, the Saanich Fair later moved to Stelly's Cross Road where it currently is today. The location of the original fair grounds was turned into a park known as Polo Park. The log cabin also still stands which houses the archives of Saanichton.
