= Island View Beach =

Island View Beach island view
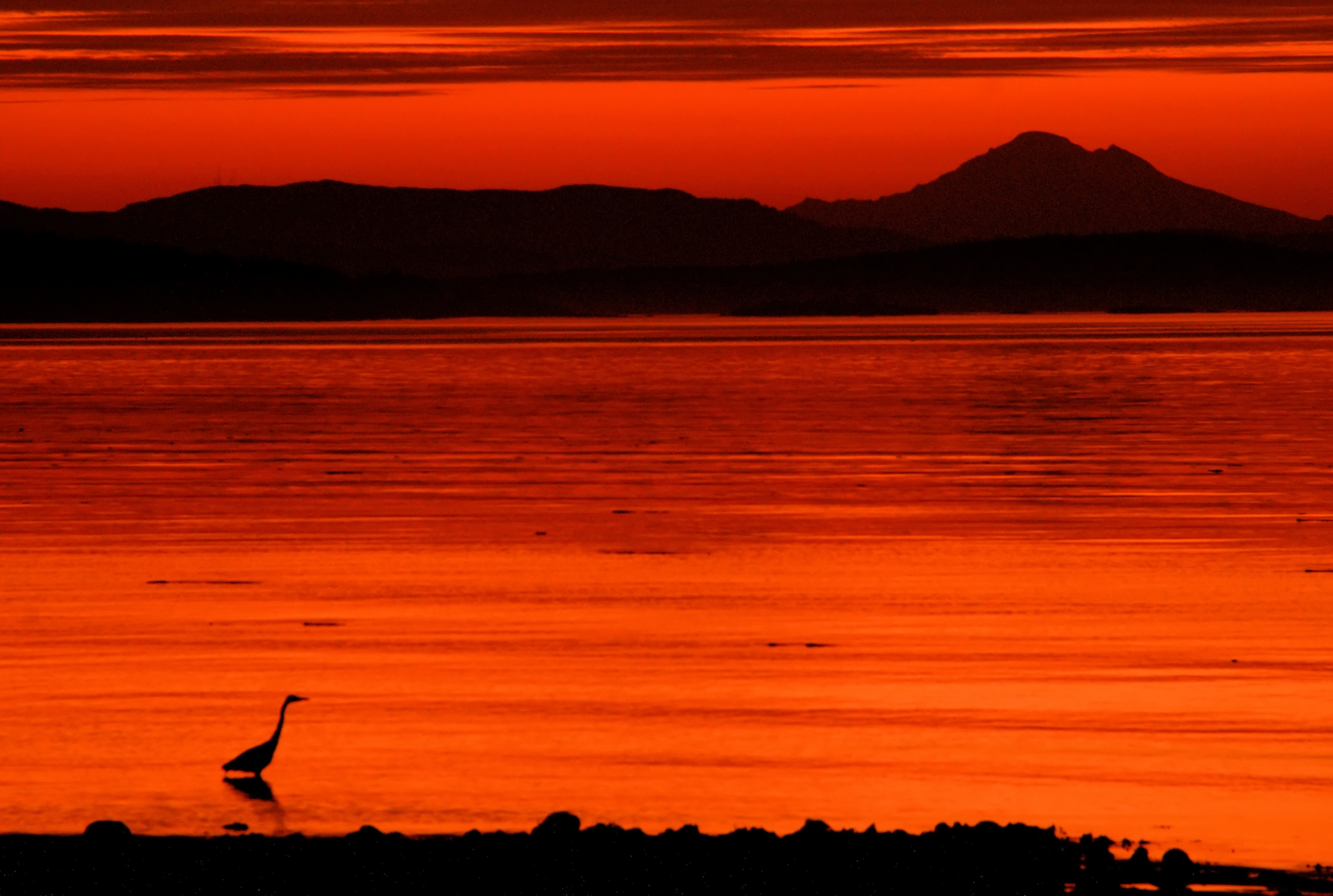
- Nickname: I-View
- Motto: bring your dog
- Location of Island View Beach, British Columbia
- Coordinates: 48°34′21″N 123°22′00″W
- Country: Canada
- Province: British Columbia
- Region: Vancouver Island
- Regional district: Capital Regional District

Area
  - City: .42 km^{2} (0.16 sq mi)
- Elevation: 0 m (0 ft)

Population (2006)
  - Metro: 0
- Time zone: UTC-8 (PST)
- Area code: 250
- Website: District of Central Saanich

Island View Beach is located on the Eastern Cordova shore of the Saanich Peninsula, near Victoria, British Columbia, Canada. Much of the southern part of the foreshore make up the public Island View Beach Regional Park.

== History ==
The Tsawout First Nation has a reservation fronting much of the northern end of the beach. The Tsawout have been living and gathering seafood from the ocean and well as gathering local medicinal plants, as part of the culture for thousands of years.

The first known European visitors were James Douglas and first mate Scott M. Jenkin in the latter half of the 18th century. Located southwest of James Island, to locals it is known as the "Beach of Destiny". Located at Homathko and Puckle Road, public parking. There is a public campground (part of the regional park) which is open for the summer season from the Victoria Day long weekend in May to the Labour Day long weekend in September.

== Geography ==
The Island View Beach terrain consists of beaches, dunes, and marshland that supports animal and plant species.

== Gallery ==
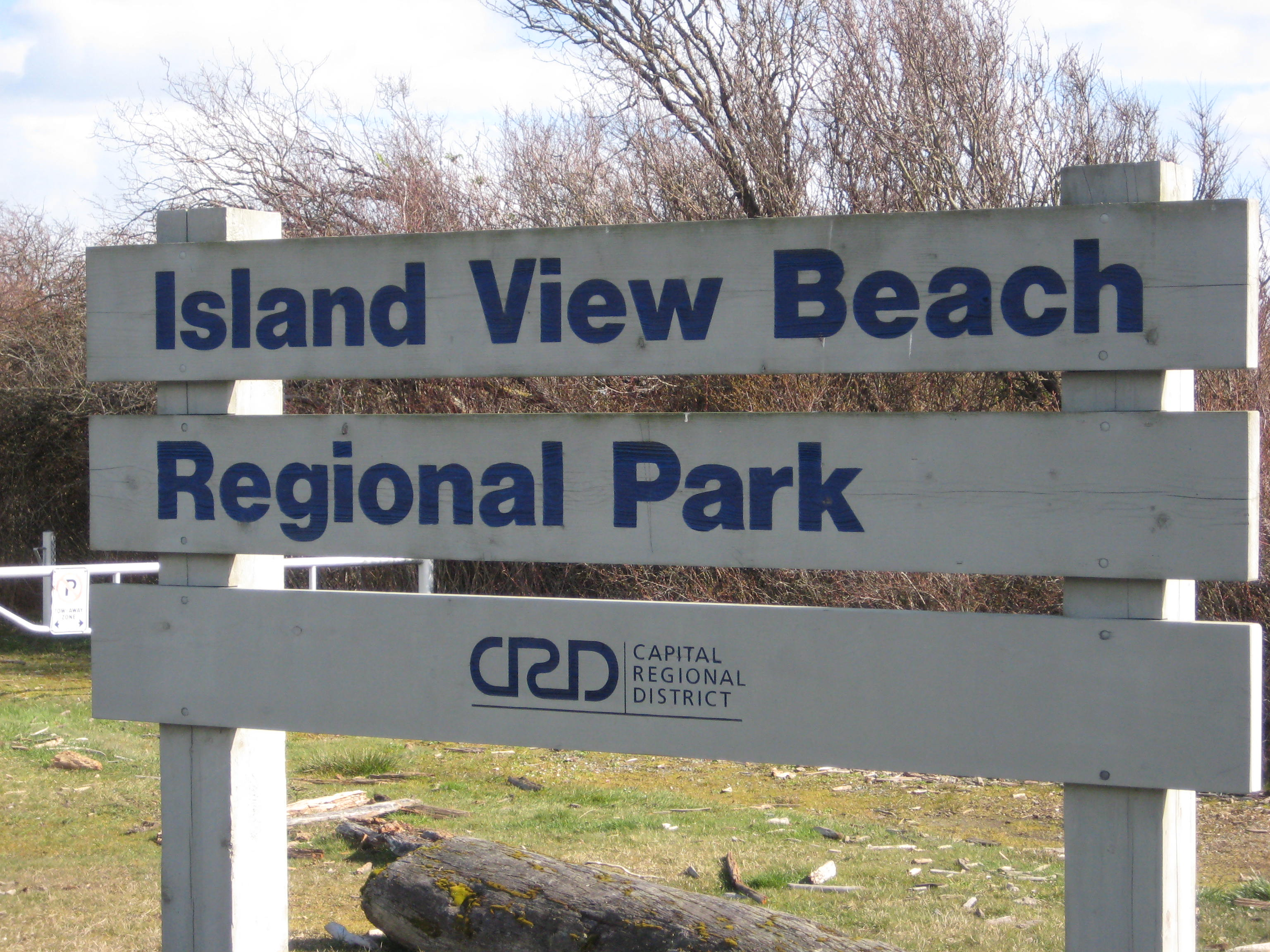
Island View Beach
