= Western Communities =

Suburban area of British Columbia, Canada

Coordinates: 48.436°N 123.504°W

The Western Communities, also called the West Shore or Westshore are a group of suburban municipalities west of Victoria, British Columbia, Canada. They include Colwood, Langford, Metchosin, and The Highlands, as well as communities in unincorporated districts west of Esquimalt Harbour and Portage Inlet, and south of Malahat in the Capital Regional District. The town of View Royal, which straddles Esquimalt Harbour, may also be included. It is an area of growing residential subdivisions and commercial centres.

West Shore Park & Recreation is governed by the West Shore Parks & Recreation Society's board of directors made up of representatives from the City of Colwood, the City of Langford, the District of Metchosin, the District of Highlands, the Juan de Fuca Electoral Area and the Town of View Royal.
