= Saanich Peninsula =

Peninsula in British Columbia, Canada

Coordinates: 48°32′59″N 123°26′00″W

Native name: W̱SÁNEĆ (Straits Salish)
- Location of Saanich Peninsula Saanich Peninsula (British Columbia)
- Interactive map of Saanich Peninsula

Geography
- Location: Southern tip of Vancouver Island

Administration
- Canada
- Province: British Columbia
- Region: Greater Victoria

Saanich Peninsula (Straits Salish: W̱SÁNEĆ) is located north of Victoria, British Columbia, Canada. It is bounded by Saanich Inlet on the west, Satellite Channel on the north, the small Colburne Passage on the northeast, and Haro Strait on the east. The exact southern boundary of what is referred to as the "Saanich Peninsula" (or simply as "the Peninsula") is somewhat fluid in local parlance.

Surrounded by the Salish Sea, Saanich Peninsula is separated from Saltspring Island by Satellite Channel, Piers Island and Coal Island by Colburne Passage, and James Island by Cordova Passage in Haro Strait.

== Name ==
Its name in the Saanich dialect, W̱SÁNEĆ, means "raised up" (when referring to people, that term means "emerging people").

== Geography and climate ==
Lying in the rain shadow of both the Vancouver Island Ranges and the Olympic Mountains, Saanich Peninsula is the driest part of Vancouver Island. The driest recording station in the provincial capital city of Victoria averages only 635 millimetres (25 in) of precipitation annually. Precipitation increases from east to west, and from south to north.

The natural flora of the region include mixed forests of Douglas fir, Western red cedar, hemlock, arbutus, Garry oak, and manzanita. The ground cover includes snowberry, Oregon grape, salal, sword fern, trillium, and fawn lily. The peninsula is characterized by rolling hills and numerous freshwater ponds and lakes. Notable natural features of Saanich Peninsula include Elk Lake, Beaver Lake, Mount Newton, Bear Hill, Tod Inlet, Mount Finlayson, Maltby Lake, Prospect Lake, Durrance Lake, and Mount Work. Many of these features are protected in regional and municipal parks.

== Geology ==
Many different kinds of bedrock underlie the peninsula. Sandstone is common at the northern end. Granodiorite crops out in many northern and central areas. Amphibolite, diorite, gabbro and quartz diorite are common in the south. Smaller areas of andesite, basalt, chert, dacite and limestone are also found.

== History ==
The Saanich Peninsula is the historical homeland of several Coast Salish peoples. Numerous First Nation Reserves are situated along the shores of Saanich Inlet. European settlers began arriving in the mid-nineteenth century, primarily engaging in resource-based industries such as logging, fishing, and notably, agriculture. The peninsula hosts the oldest agricultural exhibition in Western Canada, the Saanich Fair, organized by the North and South Saanich Agricultural Society. In recent decades, residential and commercial development has expanded across the peninsula, although provincial laws, such as the Agricultural Land Reserve, protect a significant portion of its farmland from rezoning. The region also boasts several wilderness parks, predominantly located in the southwest, with the largest being Gowlland Tod Provincial Park.

== Transportation ==
The peninsula is also the location of the Swartz Bay terminal of the BC Ferry Corporation, the Victoria International Airport at Patricia Bay, aka "Pat Bay", and the western terminal of the Washington State Ferries run through the San Juan Islands from Anacortes to Sidney. A small ferry on the west coast of the Peninsula connects Brentwood Bay to Mill Bay.

== Cultural institutions ==
Just north of Elk Lake is the Dominion Astrophysical Observatory. Butchart Gardens is located just south of the town of Brentwood Bay, which was the original home of a long-established private school of the same name.

== Governance ==
The following municipalities are located on the peninsula. They are part of Greater Victoria and member municipalities of the Capital Regional District/(CRD):

- Central Saanich (containing the villages of Brentwood Bay and Saanichton)
- Highlands
- North Saanich
- Saanich (its northern portions)
- Sidney

The Tsawout First Nation reserve and band office is located in Saanichton overlooking James Island on the east shore of the Peninsula; the Tsartlip First Nation is based on the west side of the peninsula north of Brentwood Bay; the Pauquachin First Nation is based between Mount Newton and Coles Bay on west side of the Peninsula; and the Tseycum First Nation is based on the NW of the Peninsula along the shores of Patricia Bay.

The rural community of Willis Point is also located on the peninsula, but is governed via the Juan de Fuca Electoral Area.

== See also ==
- Elk/Beaver Lake Regional Park
- Victoria and Sidney Railway
