= Gowlland Tod Provincial Park =

Provincial park in British Columbia, Canada

- IUCN category II (national park)
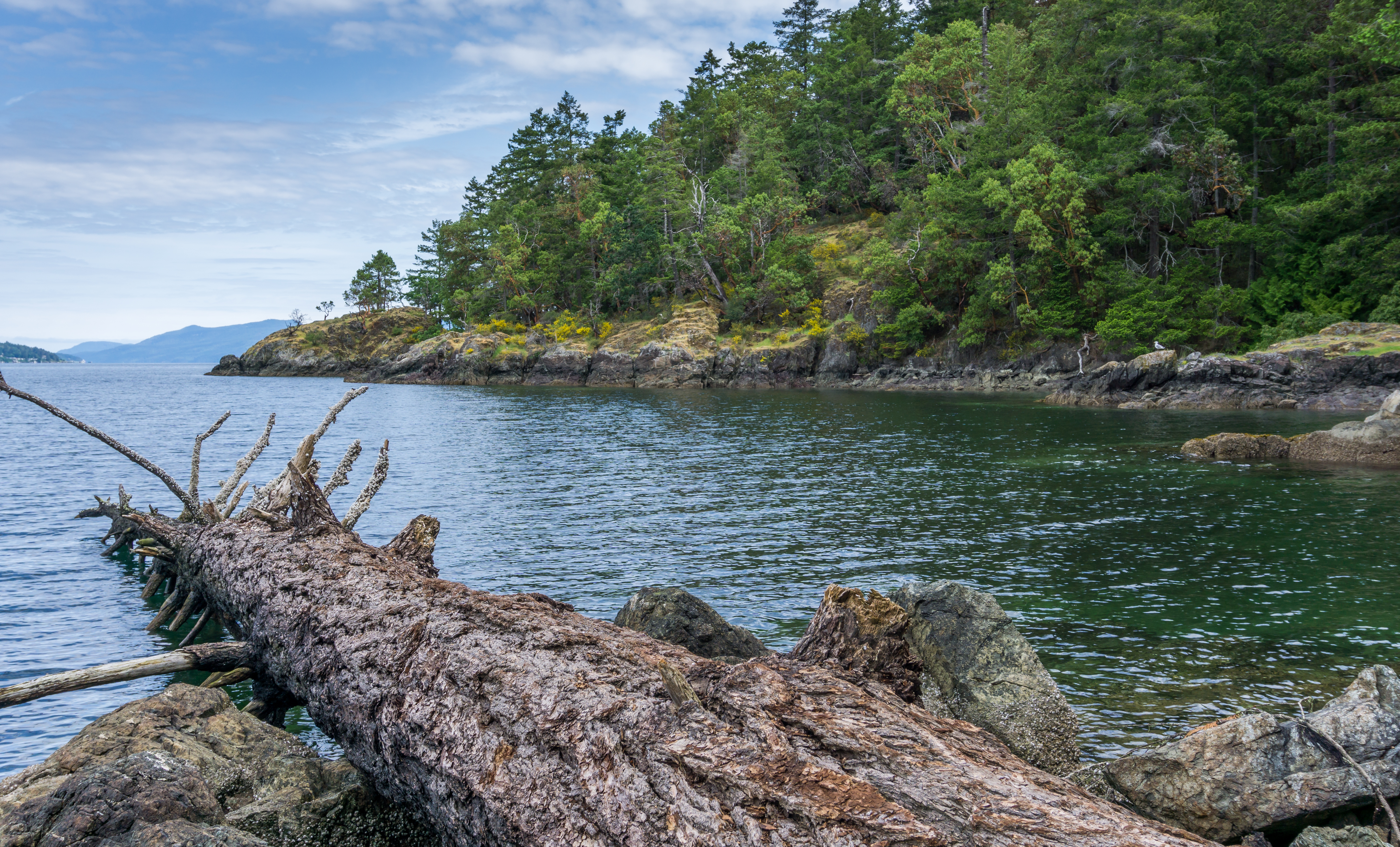
- Gowlland Tod Provincial Park

- Location within Vancouver Island Location within British Columbia Location within Capital Regional District
- Interactive map of Gowlland Tod Provincial Park
- Location: Capital RD, British Columbia, Canada
- Coordinates: 48°32′46″N 123°30′36″W
- Area: 1,280 ha (4.9 sq mi)
- Established: July 22, 1995
- Governing body: BC Parks

Gowlland Tod Provincial Park is a provincial park in British Columbia, Canada. The park protects 1,219 hectares (3,012 acres) of mixed forest of Douglas-fir, Arbutus, western redcedar, western hemlock, shore pine, grand fir, red alder, and Garry oak within the District Municipality of Highlands and the Juan de Fuca Electoral Area.

== Geography ==
Rocky outcroppings support Manzanita, Scotch broom, and Oregon grape. The peaks of the Gowlland Range, from which the park derives its name, loom over 400 m (1,300 ft) above Saanich Inlet, providing vistas of The Malahat to the west. Farther north, the park curves around inland, bounded to the north by the municipality of Central Saanich.

Overall, Gowlland Tod Park has over 150 individual plant and animal species identified, making the park rich in biodiversity.

== Accessibility ==
The park also encompasses the rural community of Willis Point. There are 25 km (16 mi) of maintained trails within the park, accessible in the south from roads leading to the park from Highlands, as well as from trails alongside Tod Inlet and McKenzie Bight to the north. Trails connect to Mount Work Regional Park and Lone Tree Hill Regional Park.
