= Brentwood Bay, British Columbia =

Human settlement in British Columbia, Canada

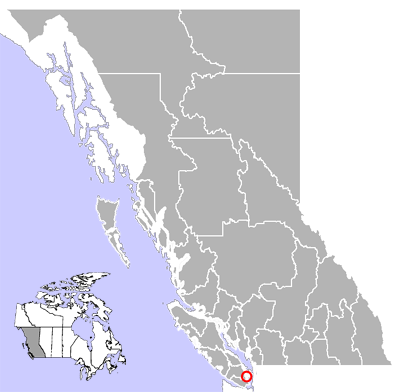
48°34′27″N 123°27′20″W

Brentwood Bay is a small village in the municipality of Central Saanich, on the Saanich Peninsula in British Columbia, Canada. It lies north of the city of Victoria, east of the community of Willis Point, and south of the town of Sidney.

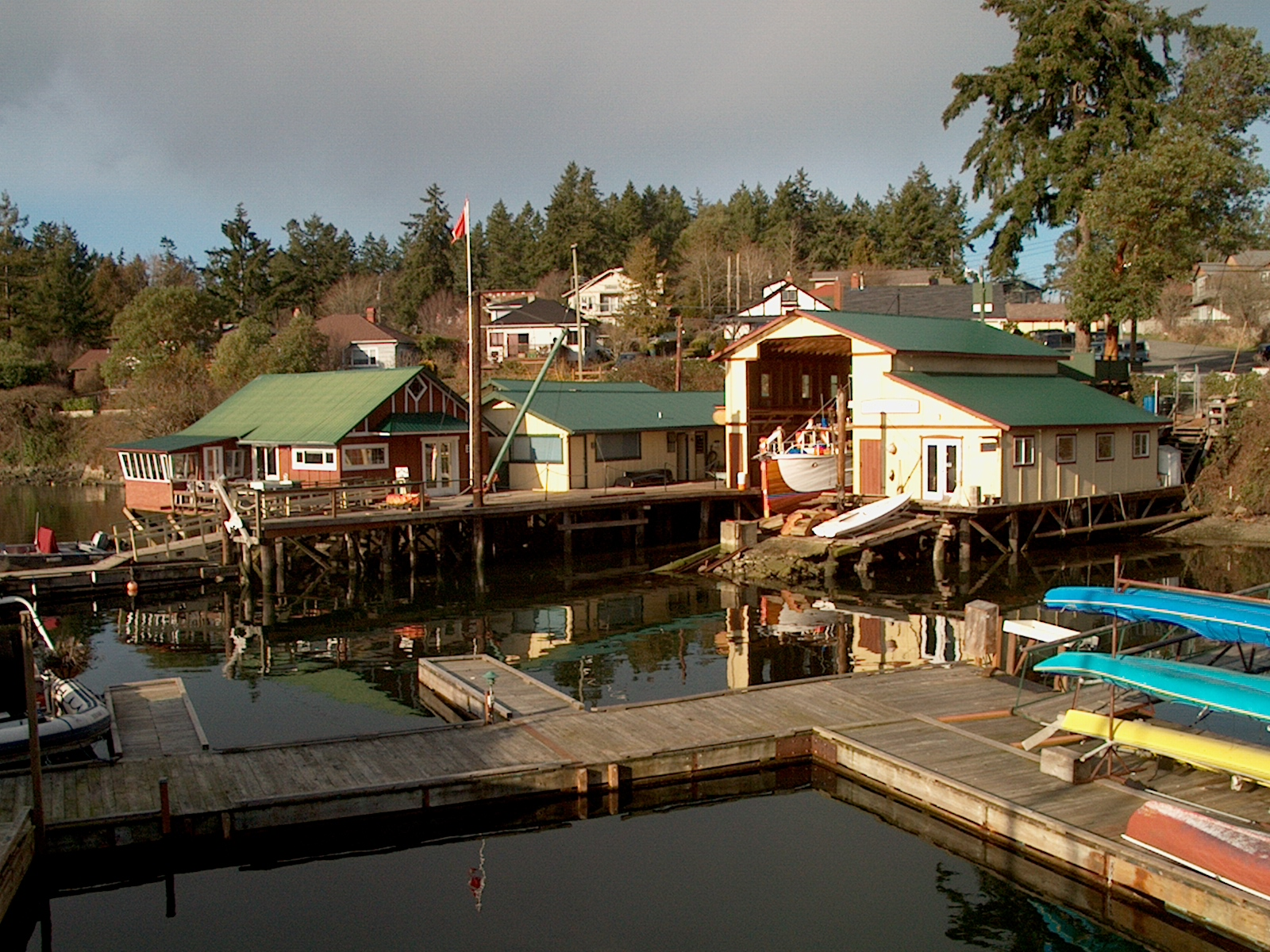
From the ferry docks at Brentwood Bay

Situated on the Saanich Inlet and the Tod Inlet, it includes the Butchart Gardens, the Victoria Butterfly Gardens and the Brentwood Bay Lodge & Spa. Brentwood Bay also includes a BC Ferries dock which connects to Mill Bay. The region also plays host to various wineries and restaurants, and also features hiking and a variety of wildlife in Gowlland Tod Provincial Park.

Brentwood Bay is part of the District of Central Saanich (pop. 17,385), one of the 13 municipalities that make up the Greater Victoria area (pop. 397,237). It is located on Highway 17A just west of Highway 17 (known locally as the "Pat Bay Highway"), the main route running the length of the Saanich Peninsula. It is also served frequently by the Brentwood-Mill Bay ferry, the MV Klitsa, run by BC Ferries.

Originally named Sluggett after an early settler, it was renamed Brentwood Bay for the town of Brentwood, Essex.

== In film ==
- Black Point starring David Caruso in 2001
- The Mermaid Chair starring Kim Basinger in 2004
- Gracepoint television series in 2014 - Remake of UK Broadchurch 2013
- Maid - 2021
- Fishing For Love - 2021 - TV movie
