= Saanichton =

Village in British Columbia, Canada

Coordinates: 48°35′41″N 123°25′10″W

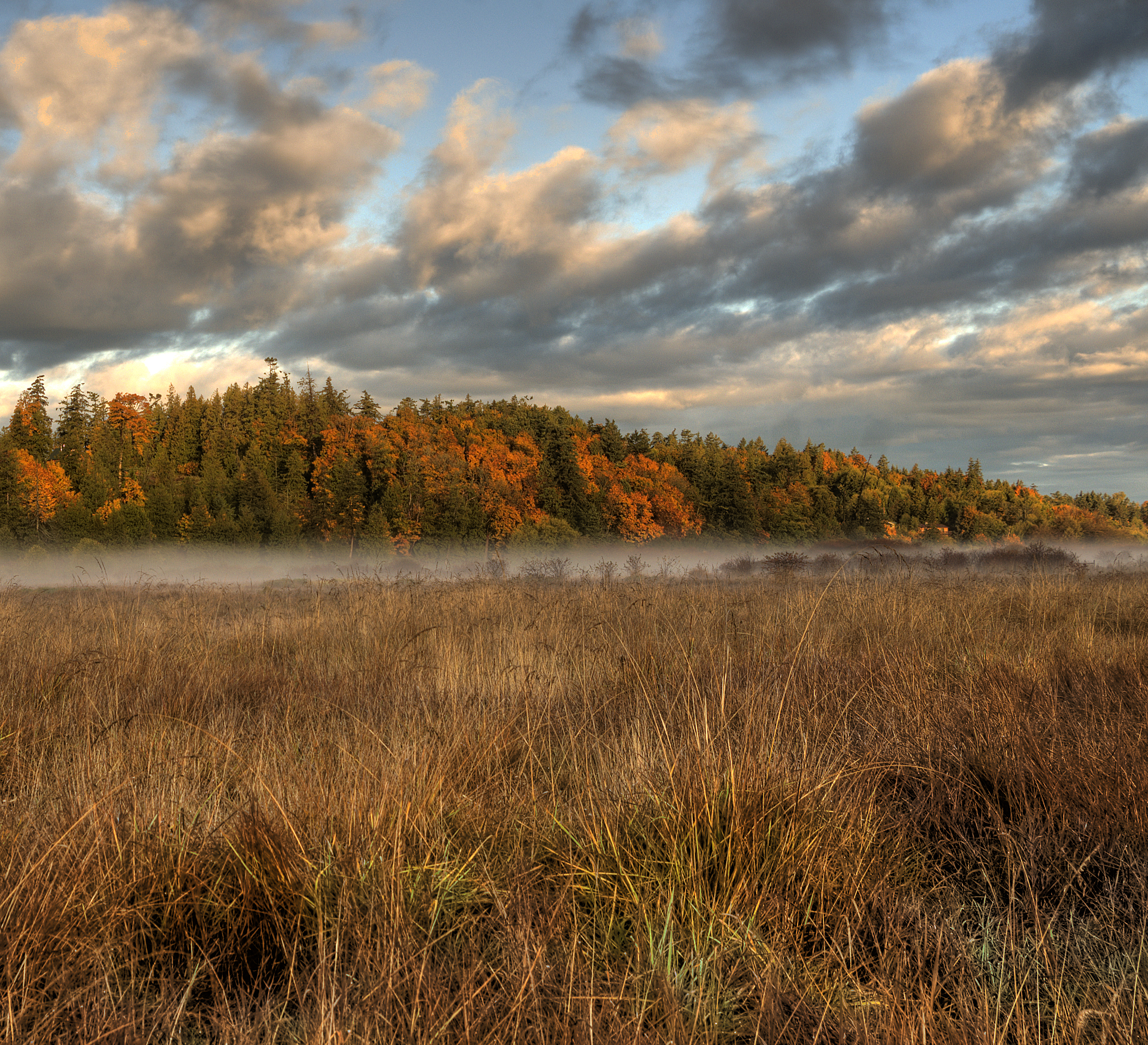
Fall colors in Saanichton, British Columbia

Saanichton, British Columbia is a village, in the municipality of Central Saanich, located between Victoria and the Swartz Bay Ferry Terminal, west of the Pat Bay Highway (Hwy 17), at the junction of Mount Newton Cross Road and East Saanich Road.

Saanichton hosts the Saanich Pioneer Museum dedicated to the history of settlement of the Saanich Peninsula.

== Climate ==
Climate data for Saanichton
Month	Jan	Feb	Mar	Apr	May	Jun	Jul	Aug	Sep	Oct	Nov	Dec	Year
Record high °C (°F)	15.5 (59.9)	16.1 (61.0)	20.5 (68.9)	25.5 (77.9)	31.5 (88.7)	33.9 (93.0)	34.4 (93.9)	32.8 (91.0)	30.5 (86.9)	27 (81)	17.8 (64.0)	15 (59)	34.4 (93.9)
Mean daily maximum °C (°F)	7.4 (45.3)	8.4 (47.1)	10.5 (50.9)	13.3 (55.9)	16.6 (61.9)	19.5 (67.1)	22.1 (71.8)	22.3 (72.1)	19.3 (66.7)	13.9 (57.0)	9.4 (48.9)	7.0 (44.6)	14.1 (57.4)
Daily mean °C (°F)	4.8 (40.6)	5.3 (41.5)	7.1 (44.8)	9.3 (48.7)	12.2 (54.0)	14.9 (58.8)	17.0 (62.6)	17.1 (62.8)	14.6 (58.3)	10.3 (50.5)	6.6 (43.9)	4.5 (40.1)	10.3 (50.5)
Mean daily minimum °C (°F)	2.2 (36.0)	2.2 (36.0)	3.6 (38.5)	5.2 (41.4)	7.8 (46.0)	10.3 (50.5)	11.9 (53.4)	11.9 (53.4)	9.8 (49.6)	6.7 (44.1)	3.8 (38.8)	1.9 (35.4)	6.4 (43.5)
Record low °C (°F)	−13.3 (8.1)	−12.2 (10.0)	−8.9 (16.0)	−3.3 (26.1)	−1.1 (30.0)	2.2 (36.0)	3.3 (37.9)	4.4 (39.9)	1.7 (35.1)	−3.9 (25.0)	−12.2 (10.0)	−13.9 (7.0)	−13.9 (7.0)
Average precipitation mm (inches)	145.1 (5.71)	89.6 (3.53)	79.3 (3.12)	51.5 (2.03)	41.5 (1.63)	34.7 (1.37)	20.5 (0.81)	26.5 (1.04)	29.6 (1.17)	93.0 (3.66)	155.8 (6.13)	141.3 (5.56)	908.2 (35.76)
Source: Environment Canada
