= Maltby Lake =

Lake in British Columbia, Canada

- Location within British Columbia
- Location: British Columbia
- Coordinates: 48°29′47″N 123°27′5″W
- Primary inflows: Unnamed Maltby Lake Tributaries
- Primary outflows: Little Maltby Lake, Bleathman Creek
- Basin countries: Canada
- Max. length: 400 m (1,300 ft)
- Max. width: 260 m (850 ft)
- Surface area: 74,869.9 m^{2} (805,893 sq ft)
- Average depth: 4.1 m (13 ft)
- Max. depth: 8 m (26 ft)
- Water volume: 292,000 m^{3} (10,300,000 cu ft) (on average)
- Surface elevation: 54 m (177 ft)

Maltby Lake is located in South southwestern Vancouver Island, British Columbia. It is located 10 km north of Victoria, British Columbia in the Tod Creek Watershed. The lake is the headwaters for the watershed, which eventually feeds the world class Butchart Gardens.

Named after Thomas and Richard Maltby, original owners of West part of Sec. 118 Lake District; Crown Grant 3882/3." Paid $22.00 in full for 22 acres September 22, 1873. Old name Highland Lake.

Maltby Lake is a pristine freshwater source in the middle of a semi rural developing area on the Saanich Peninsula on Vancouver Island. The lake and the surrounding area of pristine land hosts an abundance of wildlife, exotic aquatic life (including freshwater jellyfish) and one of the largest Douglas fir trees in the Greater Victoria area.

For over a century the lake and surrounding lands have been owned by a single extended family, which developed the property minimally. The first dwelling, an 1860s hunting cabin turned farm house, still stands. Motorized watercraft have been banned by the family since the '50s; the lake provides a potable drinking water source for the few residents there. As land taxes continue to rise (in the order of 500x in the last 40 years), the owners endeavour to maintain this idyllic setting.

Maltby Lake is an important water body in the Tod Creek Watershed. It contributes to the catchment area of Tod Creek which is estimated to be 22.8 km2 (8.8 mi2). Maltby Lake, Prospect Lake, Durrance Lake and Quarry Lake are all in the Tod Creek drainage area.

Several studies have been conducted on the lake, including a Camosun College environmental study, a PhD on frogs and an ongoing study on the hydrology and hydrogeology of the lake.

Excellent for swimming with access off Munn road.

== See also ==
- List of lakes of British Columbia
