= Bight (geography) =

Shallowly concave bend or curve in a coastline, river, or other geographical feature

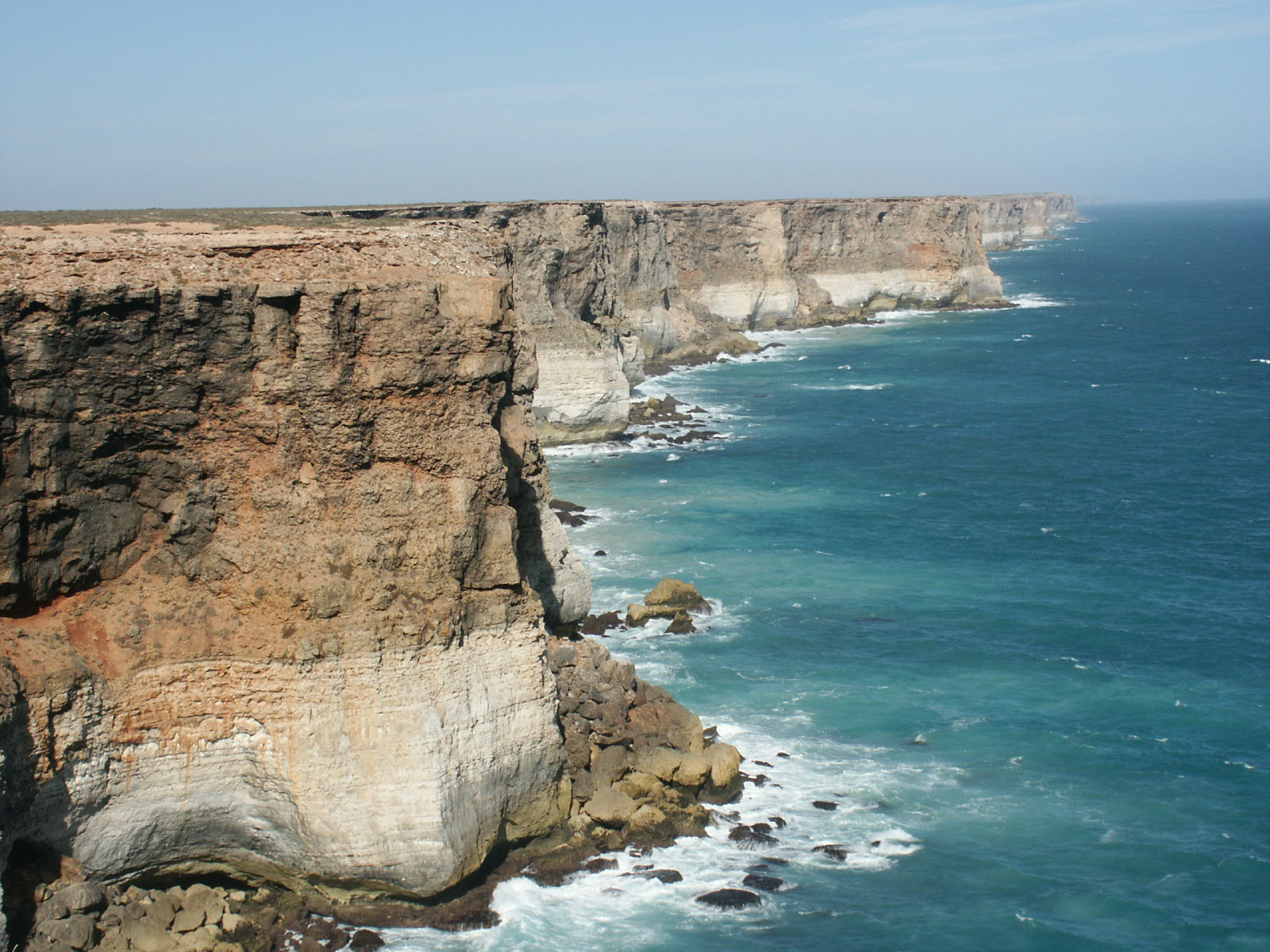
A stretch of coastline of the Great Australian Bight, a large oceanic bight composed of individual bights

In geography, a bight (/baɪt/) is a concave bend or curvature in a coastline, river or other geographical feature, or it may refer to a very open bay formed by such a feature. Such bays are typically broad, open, shallow and only slightly recessed.

== Description ==
The size of bights differs greatly, which may be as small as a bend in a river or large like a sound. Large bights are shallower than sounds. Traditionally, explorers defined a bight as a bay that could be sailed out of on a single tack in a square-rigged sailing vessel, regardless of the direction of the wind (typically meaning the apex of the bight is less than 25 degrees from the edges).

According to the United Nations Convention on the Law of the Sea, an indentation with an area as large as (or larger than) that of the semi-circle whose diameter is a line drawn across the mouth of that indentation, can be regarded as a bay not merely a bight.

== Etymology ==
The term is derived from Old English byht ("bend, angle, corner; bay, bight") with German Bucht and Danish bugt as cognates, both meaning "bay". Bight is not etymologically related to "bite" (Old English bītan).

== Notable examples ==
- Bight of Bangkok
- Bay of Campeche
- Bay of Plenty
- Bight of Benin
- Bight of Biafra
- Canterbury Bight
- German Bight or Heligoland Bight
- Great Australian Bight
- McKenzie Bight
- Mecklenburg Bight
- Mid-Atlantic Bight
- New York Bight
- North Taranaki Bight
- Robson Bight
- Santa Monica Bay
- South Taranaki Bight
- Southern Bight
- Southern California Bight
- Trinity Bight, Newfoundland and Labrador
