= Saturna, British Columbia =

Saturna
- Location of Saturna in British Columbia
- Coordinates: 48°48′00″N 123°12′00″W
- Country: Canada
- Province: British Columbia
- First settled: 1869
- Area codes: 250, 778

Saturna is an unincorporated locality on Saturna Island, one of the Southern Gulf Islands of British Columbia, Canada. Saturna is the location of the island's BC Ferries terminal.

== History ==
In 1791, the Spanish vessel known as the "Santa Saturnina", assembled in Nootka in 1790, and led by José María Narváez, visited the area, naming it after the Spanish vessel.

The community was settled for the first time in 1869 by Peter Fraser, a white colonist.

In 1892, the longest standing building in the area, built by Gerald Payne, is constructed.
