= James Island (British Columbia) =

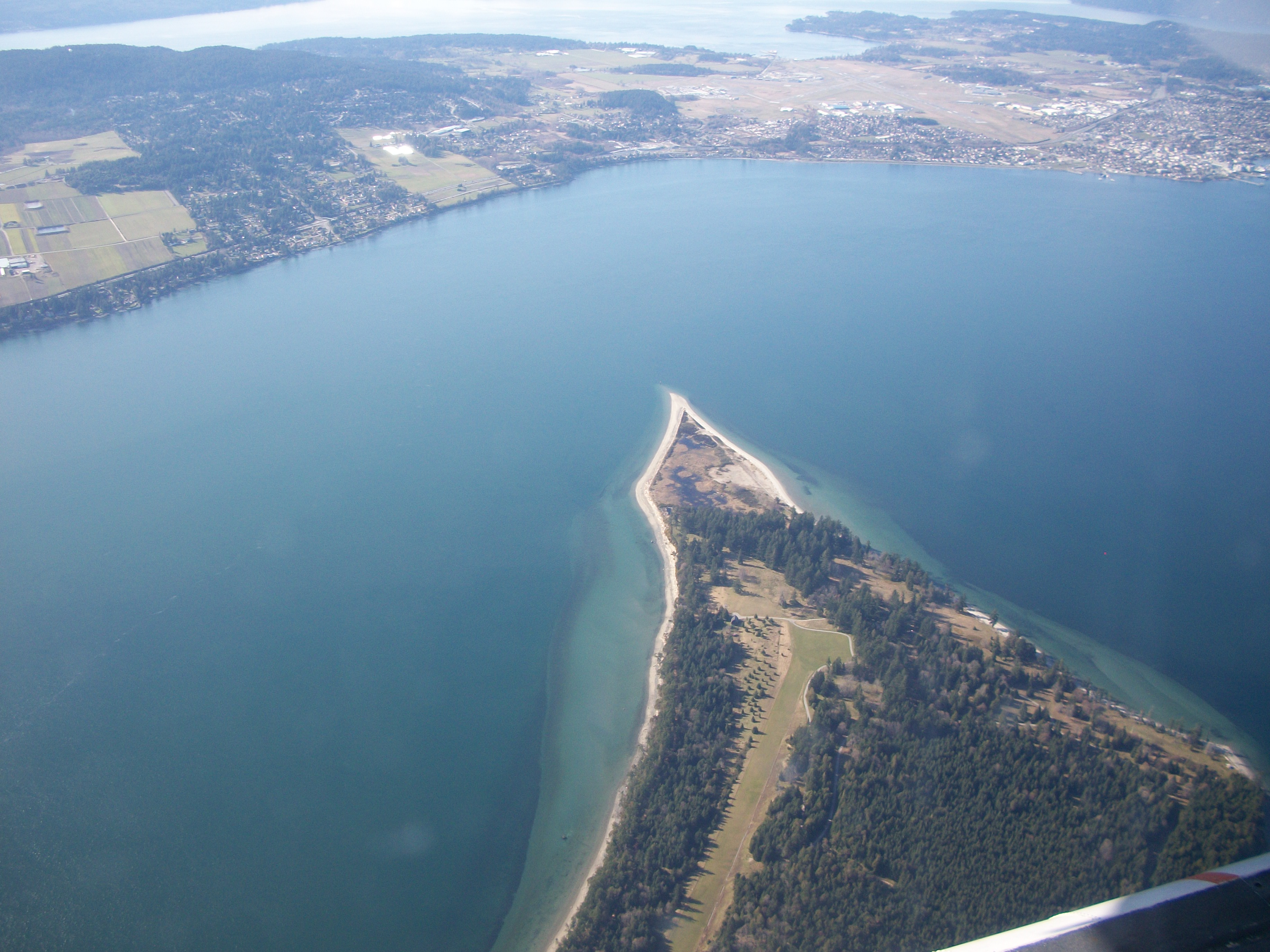

- Location of James Island in British Columbia
- Coordinates: 48°36′17″N 123°20′58″W
- Country: Canada
- Province: British Columbia

Population (2012)
  - Total: < 8
- Time zone: UTC−07:00 (Pacific Time)

James Island, one of British Columbia's Gulf Islands, lies in Haro Strait between Sidney Island and the coast of Vancouver Island near Sidney, British Columbia. James Island is approximately 2.4 km (1.5 mi) from the coast of Vancouver Island, and 145 km (90 mi) from Seattle, Washington. James Island has an elevation of 145 metres (476 feet) above sea level at its highest point, and has a total land-mass of 315 hectares (780 acres). There are sea-cliffs on the Southern, Western, and Eastern shores of this island. The Southern sea-cliffs are the highest.

== Toponymy ==
In Saanich (SENĆOŦEN), the language of the Saanich (W̱SÁNEĆ) nations, the island is named BOḰEĆ (NAPA: p̕áqʷəč).

According to Walbran the island was "Named by the early settlers, circa 1853, after ... James Douglas ...". Douglas was a chief factor of the Hudson's Bay Company and was second governor of the Colony of Vancouver Island. Further, Walbran stated "Name adopted by Captain Richards, HMS Plumper, 1858." From 1857 to 1862 Richards supervised hydrographic surveys of the southern coast of British Columbia.

== History ==
The island is within the traditional territories of the Tsawout First Nation. Hereditary chief Louie Pelkey of the Tsawout was born on the island in 1860. Although it is east of the North Saanich Douglas Treaty area and south of the Hul'q'umin'um Treaty area, it is not within a Douglas Treaty area. In the early 1900s, the island was used as a private hunting ground for Victoria sportsmen including then British Columbia Premier Richard McBride, who served between 1903 and 1915. In 1913 a dynamite plant was established on the island. The plant was owned by a company that merged into Canadian Explosives Ltd, which in turn changed its name to Canadian Industries Limited (CIL) in 1927. From the outset of World War II, the plant was operated by Defence Industries Ltd, a subsidiary of CIL. The plant, and many of its workers' cottages, had been moved to the island from Nanaimo. At its peak, the plant employed 800 people, most of whom lived in a small, traffic-free village on the opposite end of the island. During World War II, the plant produced 900 tonnes (990 short tons) of TNT per month. The TNT plant closed in 1977, and it and the village were disassembled and removed from the island in 1979.

James Island was purchased by Craig McCaw in 1994 for $19 million. Since then there was repeated legal action taken against ICI (formerly CIL) as the new owner was unable to turn over the property to residential use as per his intention due to its industrial history, a status which had been well-documented as of the sale. Recent luxury resort development on the island includes a golf course, yacht moorage, seaplane ramp, and an airstrip.

McCaw has reportedly established an environmental regime on James Island where insecticides are not allowed, power lines are underground and electric cars and golf carts are used for transportation. The island was the property with the highest assessed value in the Capital Regional District in 2009, at almost $76 million. In June, 2012, the island was put on the market with an asking price of $75 million. The Island is no longer listed and reportedly no longer for sale.

== Ecology ==
In the Biogeoclimatic Ecosystem Classification of the British Columbia Forest Service the island is entirely Coastal Douglas Fir Lowland.

== Local Government ==
The island is within the Capital Regional District and also within the North Pender Island Local Trust Area of the Islands Trust. Land use is governed by the Trust with representation by the North Pender Local Trust Committee. Local government matters other than land use are governed by the Regional District with representation for the Southern Gulf Islands, Electoral Area G, by one elected director.

Although the North Pender Local Trust Committee has authority for land use and the island has no resident landowners, its official community plan and land use bylaws are independent of North Pender.

== See also ==
- Departure Bay#History of the area
