= Central Saanich =

- District municipality
- The Corporation of the District of Central Saanich
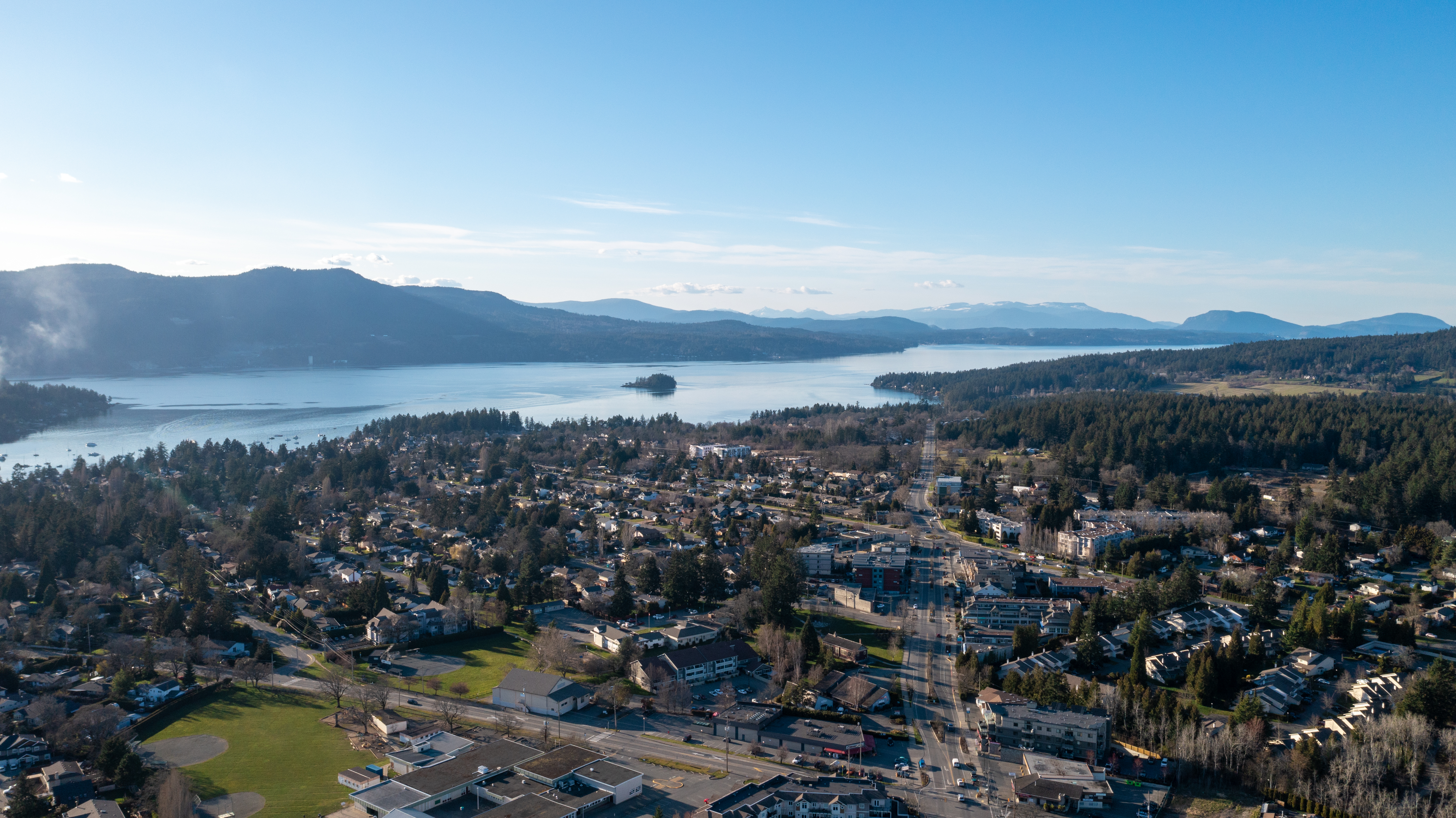

- Flag

- Location of Central Saanich within the Capital Regional District

- Location of Central Saanich in British Columbia Central Saanich (British Columbia)
- Coordinates: 48°30′51″N 123°23′2″W
- Country: Canada
- Province: British Columbia
- Regional district: Capital
- Incorporated: 1950

Government
  - Governing body: Central Saanich District Council
  - Mayor: Zeb King
  - MP: Elizabeth May (Green)
  - MLA: Emily Lowan (BC Green)

Area
  - Land: 41.20 km^{2} (15.91 sq mi)
- Elevation: 100 m (330 ft)

Population (2021)
  - Total: 17,385
  - Density: 421.9/km^{2} (1,093/sq mi)
- Time zone: UTC−07:00 (PT)
- Forward sortation area: V8M
- Highways: 17
- Waterways: Saanich Inlet, Tod Inlet
- Website: www.centralsaanich.ca

Central Saanich is a district municipality in Greater Victoria, British Columbia, Canada, and a member municipality of the Capital Regional District. It is located on the Saanich Peninsula, in the far south-east of Vancouver Island. It is the traditional territory of the W̱SÁNEĆ people. The district began as a farming community, and many hobby farms, along working farms and vineyards, still exist. In recent decades, the area has seen increasing residential, commercial, and industrial development, especially around the neighbourhoods of Brentwood Bay and Saanichton, which are occasionally referred to as separate communities.

The area's best-known tourist attractions are the Butchart Gardens, located in the Brentwood Bay area, Gowlland Tod Provincial Park, and Island View Beach.

The mayor of Central Saanich is former district councillor Ryan Windsor. Municipal councillors last elected in 2022 include Niall Paltiel, Sarah Riddell, Zeb King, Bob Thompson, Gord Newton, and Christopher Graham.

== Geography ==
Neighbourhoods of Central Saanich:

- Brentwood Bay
- Saanichton
- Island View
- Keating
- Tanner Ridge (also Saanich)

== Demographics ==
In the 2021 Census of Population conducted by Statistics Canada, Central Saanich had a population of 17,385 living in 7,105 of its 7,621 total private dwellings, a change of 3.4% from its 2016 population of 16,814. With a land area of 41.2 km^{2} (15.9 sq mi), it had a population density of 422.0/km^{2} (1,092.9/sq mi) in 2021.

Historical census populations – Central Saanich

Year	Pop.	±%
1951	2,069	—
1956	2,477	+19.7%
1961	2,952	+19.2%
1966	3,640	+23.3%
1971	5,136	+41.1%
1976	7,413	+44.3%
1981	9,890	+33.4%
1986	11,475	+16.0%

Year	Pop.	±%
1991	13,684	+19.3%
1996	14,611	+6.8%
2001	15,348	+5.0%
2006	15,745	+2.6%
2011	15,936	+1.2%
2016	16,814	+5.5%
2021	17,385	+3.4%

Source: Statistics Canada

=== Ethnicity ===
Panethnic groups in the District of Central Saanich (1996−2021)
Panethnic group	2021		2016		2011		2006		2001		1996	
Panethnic group	Pop.	%	Pop.	%	Pop.	%	Pop.	%	Pop.	%	Pop.	%
European (Note: Statistic includes all persons that did not make up part of a visible minority or an indigenous identity.)	15,065	87.74%	14,745	89.53%	14,435	91.8%	14,585	93.46%	14,635	95.53%	13,635	94.36%
Indigenous	655	3.81%	660	4.01%	420	2.67%	215	1.38%	200	1.31%	85	0.59%
South Asian	490	2.85%	365	2.22%	225	1.43%	195	1.25%	140	0.91%	225	1.56%
East Asian (Note: Statistic includes total responses of "Chinese", "Korean", and "Japanese" under visible minority section on census.)	405	2.36%	355	2.16%	230	1.46%	310	1.99%	105	0.69%	210	1.45%
Southeast Asian (Note: Statistic includes total responses of "Filipino" and "Southeast Asian" under visible minority section on census.)	255	1.49%	175	1.06%	115	0.73%	205	1.31%	175	1.14%	100	0.69%
African	105	0.61%	80	0.49%	115	0.73%	35	0.22%	50	0.33%	105	0.73%
Latin American	90	0.52%	50	0.3%	65	0.41%	25	0.16%	10	0.07%	45	0.31%
Middle Eastern (Note: Statistic includes total responses of "West Asian" and "Arab" under visible minority section on census.)	35	0.2%	0	0%	60	0.38%	20	0.13%	10	0.07%	0	0%
Other/multiracial (Note: Statistic includes total responses of "Visible minority, n.i.e." and "Multiple visible minorities" under visible minority section on census.)	80	0.47%	20	0.12%	35	0.22%	25	0.16%	15	0.1%	35	0.24%
Total responses	17,170	98.76%	16,470	97.95%	15,725	98.68%	15,605	99.11%	15,320	99.82%	14,450	98.9%
Total population	17,385	100%	16,814	100%	15,936	100%	15,745	100%	15,348	100%	14,611	100%
Note: Totals greater than 100% due to multiple origin responses.

=== Religion ===
According to the 2021 census, religious groups in Central Saanich included:

- Irreligion (10,150 persons or 59.1%)
- Christianity (6,365 persons or 37.1%)
- Sikhism (270 persons or 1.6%)
- Judaism (110 persons or 0.6%)
- Buddhism (70 persons or 0.4%)
- Islam (40 persons or 0.2%)
- Hinduism (15 persons or 0.1%)
- Other (150 persons or 0.9%)

== Potato ban ==
The production of potatoes from Central Saanich, east of the West Saanich Road, was banned in 1982 due to infestation by the golden nematode. Potatoes from this region of Central Saanich are banned from entry into the United States.

== Notable people ==
- Jamie Benn, ice hockey winger for the Dallas Stars of the National Hockey League (NHL).
- Silken Laumann, Canadian champion rower.
- Wife and husband Lorna Crozier and Patrick Lane, both award-winning Canadian poets.
- Roy Sydney Baker-Falkner, grew up in Saanich in the 1920s and went on to be one of the top Second World War Naval Aviators from Canada and UK., and one of the few Canadians who took part in the Battle of Britain.
