= Highlands, British Columbia =

Highlands
- District municipality
- District of Highlands
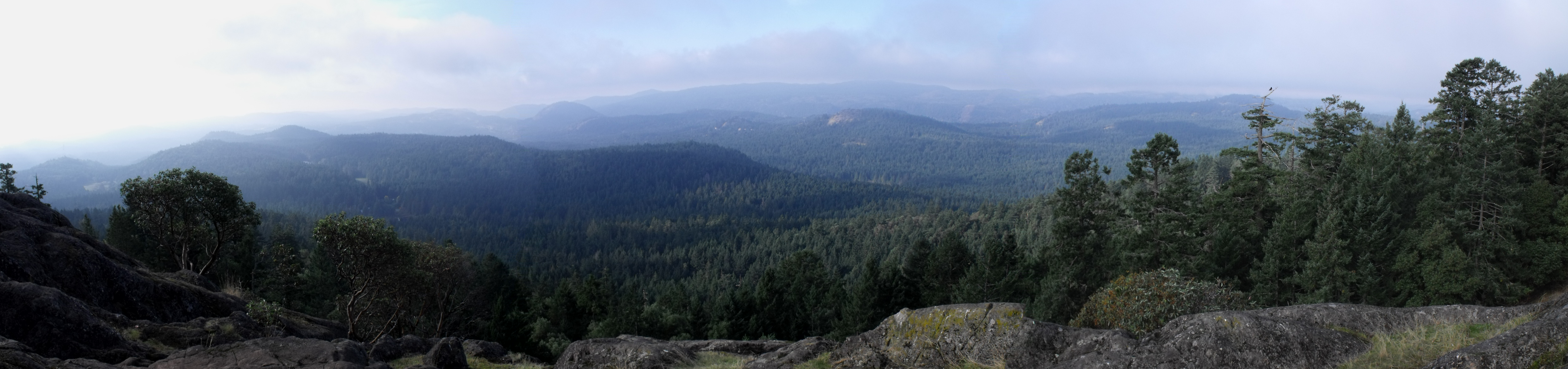

- Location of Highlands within the Capital Regional District

- Location of Highlands in British Columbia
- Coordinates: 48°31′N 123°30′W
- Country: Canada
- Province: British Columbia
- Region: Greater Victoria
- Regional district: Capital Regional District
- Incorporated: 1993

Government
  - Mayor: Ken Williams

Area
  - Total: 38.05 km^{2} (14.69 sq mi)

Population (2016)
  - Total: 2,225
  - Density: 58.5/km^{2} (152/sq mi)
- Time zone: UTC−07:00 (PT)
- Highways: 1
- Waterways: Saanich Inlet
- Website: www.highlands.ca

The District of Highlands (locally known as "The Highlands") is a district municipality near Victoria, British Columbia, Canada. As one of the Western Communities or West Shore municipalities outside Victoria, Highlands has a population of 2,225 as of 2016. The region stretches along the Saanich Inlet shoreline from north of Goldstream to Mackenzie Bight. One of the more undeveloped areas of the Greater Victoria region, it is one of the newest Greater Victoria municipalities created within the Capital Regional District.

Although the area is seen as a target for residential expansion of the Greater Victoria region, it remains best known for lakes, hills, and wilderness. It is home to many parks, notably large portions of Gowlland Tod Provincial Park, Mount Work Regional Park, and Lone Tree Hill Regional Park.

The nearest commercial shopping areas are in the adjacent municipality of Langford. Public education is provided by the Sooke School District's elementary, middle, and secondary schools in Langford.

== Notable people ==
- Jonathan Reaume, ARCA Menards Series West driver and team owner
- Josiah Reaume, ARCA Menards Series West driver
