= Capital Regional District =

Regional district in British Columbia, Canada

Capital
- Regional district
- Capital Regional District
- Logo
- Nickname: CRD
- Motto: Making a difference...together
- Major communities

- Location in British Columbia
- Country: Canada
- Province: British Columbia
- Incorporated: 1966
- Administrative office location: Victoria

Government
  - Body: Board of directors
  - Chair: Colin Plant (Saanich)
  - Vice chair: Maja Tait (Sooke)
  - Electoral areas: Juan de Fuca; Salt Spring Island; Southern Gulf Islands

Area
  - Total: 2,340.49 km^{2} (903.67 sq mi)

Population (2021)
  - Total: 415,451
  - Density: 177.7/km^{2} (460/sq mi)
- Time zone: UTC-8 (PST)
  - Summer (DST): UTC-7 (PDT)
- Area codes: 250 / 778 / 236 / 672
- Website: www.crd.bc.ca

The Capital Regional District (CRD) is a local government administrative district encompassing the southern tip of Vancouver Island and the southern Gulf Islands in the Canadian province of British Columbia. The CRD is one of several regional districts in British Columbia and had an official population of 415,451 as of the Canada 2021 Census.

The CRD encompasses the thirteen municipalities of Greater Victoria and three unincorporated areas: Juan de Fuca Electoral Area on Vancouver Island, Salt Spring Island Electoral Area, and Southern Gulf Islands Electoral Area. The CRD also acts as the local government for most purposes in the Electoral Areas. CRD headquarters is in the City of Victoria, although there are many office and operational facilities throughout the region. The total land area is 2,341.11 km^{2} (903.91 sq mi).

The CRD was formed in 1966 as a federation of seven municipalities and five electoral areas to provide coordination of regional issues and local government in rural areas in the Greater Victoria region.

== Demographics ==
As a census division in the 2021 Census of Population conducted by Statistics Canada, the Capital Regional District had a population of 415,451 living in 185,206 of its 198,435 total private dwellings, a change of 8.4% from its 2016 population of 383,360. With a land area of 2,338.22 km^{2} (902.79 sq mi), it had a population density of 177.7/km^{2} (460.2/sq mi) in 2021.

== Ethnicity ==
The Capital Regional District (CRD) in British Columbia has a mostly European population, but it includes a diverse and growing mix of other ethnic groups. As of the 2021 Census, the approximate ethnic breakdown is as follows:

- European: 78.85%
- East Asian: 5.77%
- Indigenous (First Nations): 4.97%
- South Asian: 3.40%
- Southeast Asian: 3.08%
- African: 1.27%
- Latin American: 0.99%
- Middle Eastern: 0.87%
- Other: 0.79%

Results can sum to more than 100% because people may report multiple ethnic origins.

The visible minority population in the CRD, especially in Greater Victoria, is lower than the provincial average. In 2021, about 16.7% of Greater Victoria residents identified as visible minorities, compared to 34.4% in all of British Columbia. The largest visible minority groups in the region are Chinese (4.5%), South Asian (3.5%), and Filipino(2.2%).

Panethnic groups in the Capital Regional District (2001−2021)
Panethnic group	2021		2016		2011		2006		2001	
Panethnic group	Pop.	%	Pop.	%	Pop.	%	Pop.	%	Pop.	%
European (Note: Statistic includes all persons that did not make up part of a visible minority or an indigenous identity.)	320,205	78.85%	304,005	81.53%	297,865	84.85%	294,380	86.57%	284,025	88.56%
East Asian (Note: Statistic includes total responses of "Chinese", "Korean", and "Japanese" under visible minority section on census.)	23,415	5.77%	21,205	5.69%	16,270	4.63%	16,015	4.71%	13,900	4.33%
Indigenous	20,195	4.97%	17,880	4.8%	14,780	4.21%	11,365	3.34%	9,100	2.84%
South Asian	13,825	3.4%	10,280	2.76%	7,620	2.17%	7,300	2.15%	5,805	1.81%
Southeast Asian (Note: Statistic includes total responses of "Filipino" and "Southeast Asian" under visible minority section on census.)	12,490	3.08%	8,700	2.33%	6,260	1.78%	4,410	1.3%	3,085	0.96%
African	5,175	1.27%	3,535	0.95%	2,975	0.85%	2,380	0.7%	2,235	0.7%
Latin American	4,015	0.99%	2,675	0.72%	1,885	0.54%	1,890	0.56%	1,190	0.37%
Middle Eastern (Note: Statistic includes total responses of "West Asian" and "Arab" under visible minority section on census.)	3,535	0.87%	2,575	0.69%	1,725	0.49%	1,095	0.32%	690	0.22%
Other (Note: Statistic includes total responses of "Visible minority, n.i.e." and "Multiple visible minorities" under visible minority section on census.)	3,225	0.79%	2,010	0.54%	1,675	0.48%	1,230	0.36%	685	0.21%
Total responses	406,080	97.74%	372,875	97.26%	351,060	97.52%	340,055	98.52%	320,710	98.45%
Total population	415,451	100%	383,360	100%	359,991	100%	345,164	100%	325,754	100%

- Note: Totals greater than 100% due to multiple origin responses.

== Political divisions ==
The CRD comprises the 13 municipalities of Greater Victoria, three electoral areas and 10 Indigenous reserves. The reserves have a relatively small portion of the population with 5,244 participating in the 2016 census. Some reserves did not participate; those that did are included in the population figures of the municipality or electoral area encompassing them, however the CRD regional government and local governments have no jurisdiction over reserves. Saanich and Victoria together have over 50 percent of the region's population.

Division	Census Subdivision type	Population (2021)	Population (2016)	Change (2016-2021)
Saanich	District municipality	117,735	114,148	3.1%
Victoria	City	91,867	85,792	7.1%
Langford	City	46,584	35,342	31.8%
Oak Bay	District municipality	17,990	18,094	-0.6%
Esquimalt	Town	17,533	17,655	-0.7%
Colwood	City	18,961	16,859	12.5%
Central Saanich	District municipality	17,385	16,814	3.4%
Sooke	District municipality	15,086	13,001	16.0%
Sidney	Town	12,318	11,672	5.5%
North Saanich	District municipality	12,235	11,249	8.8%
View Royal	Town	11,575	10,408	11.2%
Metchosin	District municipality	5,067	4,708	7.6%
Highlands	District municipality	2,482	2,225	11.6%
Salt Spring Island	Regional district electoral area	11,635	10,557	10.2%
Juan de Fuca	Regional district electoral area	5,531	4,860	13.8%
Southern Gulf Islands	Regional district electoral area	6,101	4,732	28.9%
Total Capital Regional District		415,451	383,360	8.4%

== Electoral Areas ==
=== Salt Spring Island Electoral Area ===
The Salt Spring Island Electoral Area of the Capital Regional District (CRD) of British Columbia consists of unincorporated areas in the CRD located on Salt Spring Island. It is represented by one director on the CRD.

The major localities encompassed by the electoral area are:

- Ganges
- Fulford Harbour
- Vesuvius Bay
- Long Harbour
- Beaver Point
- Musgrave Landing

According to the Canada 2021 Census:

- Population: 11,635
- % Change (2016-2021): 28.9
- Area (km².): 182.23
- Density (persons per km².): 63.8

=== Southern Gulf Islands Electoral Area ===
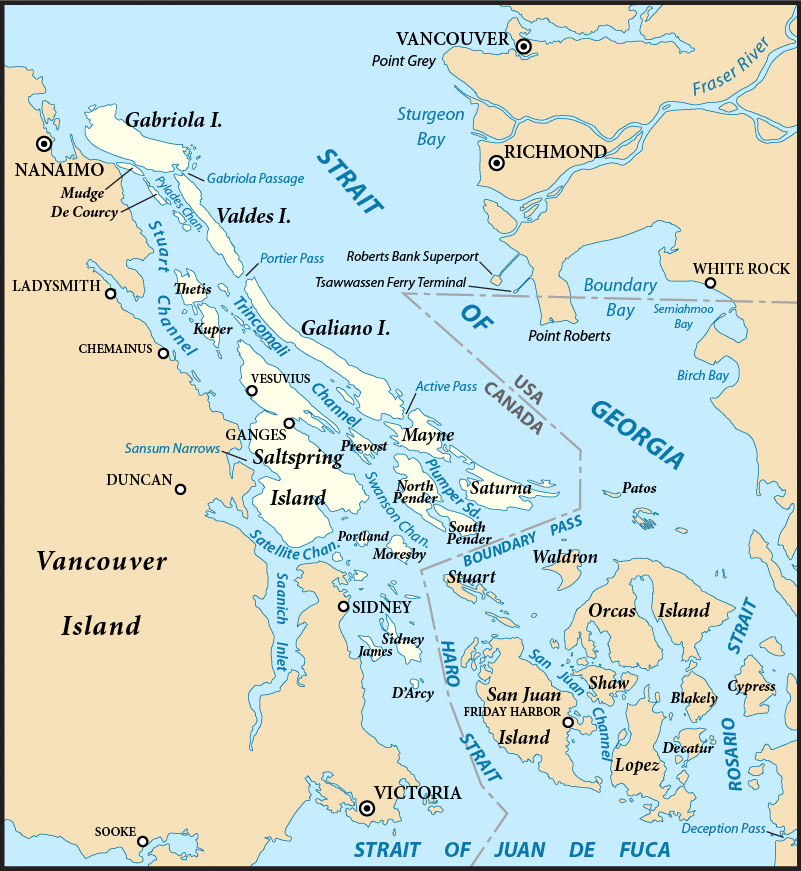
Southern Gulf Islands (British Columbia) in the Strait of Georgia

The Southern Gulf Islands Electoral Area of the Capital Regional District (CRD) of British Columbia consists of unincorporated districts in the CRD located on Galiano, Saturna, Mayne, and North and South Pender Islands, as well as many smaller islands located in the Gulf of Georgia north and east of Victoria. It is previously known as the Outer Gulf Islands Electoral Area. Its population of 6,101 is represented by one director on the CRD.

The major localities encompassed by the electoral area are:

- Bedwell Harbour (South Pender Island)
- Montague Harbour (Galiano Island)
- Otter Bay (North Pender Island)
- Saturna (Saturna Island)
- Sturdies Bay (Galiano Island)
- Village Bay (Mayne Island)

=== Juan de Fuca Electoral Area ===
The Juan de Fuca Electoral Area is an Electoral Area of the CRD. It consists of the District's unincorporated land on Vancouver Island, including the neighbourhood of Willis Point on the Saanich Inlet, Malahat, on the western shore of Saanich Inlet, and the Western Communities localities of East Sooke, Jordan River, Otter Point, Shirley, Port Renfrew, inclusive of the First Nations reserves of Gordon River 2 and Pacheena 1, which are within its territory. Its population of 5,531 is represented by a single director of the CRD. The total land area is 1,502.24 km^{2} (580.0 sq mi). Population figures do not included residents of Indian Reserves, whether band members or non-indigenous persons.

== Administrative role ==
The board of directors are either directly elected officials or are appointed from within the region's elected municipal councils.

The CRD's responsibilities include recycling, operating the regional landfill, building and operating sewage treatment plants, a sewer source control program, regional water supply, funding for non-profit arts groups, regional planning, funding health facilities, and overseeing thirty regional parks, trails, and regional park reserves encompassing over 100 km^{2}. The CRD is the sole shareholder of the Capital Region Housing Corporation, which owns and operates over 1200 rental housing units. In certain areas, the CRD can pass bylaws that are binding on a portion of the geographical area or the entire geographical area. These include a "clean air bylaw" smoking ban in all public places and patios in restaurants/pubs.

The CRD assumes responsibilities ordinarily undertaken by municipalities in unincorporated areas of the CRD. These responsibilities include animal control, building inspection, fire protection, and bylaw enforcement. Some of the region's municipalities avail themselves of some of these services in a contractual arrangement with the CRD.

== Capital Regional Hospital District ==
The CRHD's primary responsibility is to provide the region's share of capital funding for the region's health facilities and equipment. The region's health care delivery is the responsibility of the Vancouver Island Health Authority (VIHA). The CRHD shares the same Board of Directors with the CRD.

== See also ==
- Metro Vancouver Regional District
- Greater Victoria
- Gulf Islands
