= Mount Work =

Mountain in British Columbia, Canada

- Location within British Columbia
- Location in Mount Work Regional Park

Highest point
- Elevation: 449 m (1,473 ft)
- Prominence: 449 m (1,473 ft)
- Isolation: 6.5 km (4.0 mi)
- Listing: Mountains of British Columbia
- Coordinates: 48°31′50.04″N 123°28′49.07″W

Geography
- Location: District of Highlands, Vancouver Island
- District: Highland Land District
- Parent range: Gowlland Range
- Topo map: NTS 92B11 Sidney

Mount Work is a 449 m (1,473 ft) mountain in the Gowlland Range on southern Vancouver Island. It is located within Mount Work Regional Park in the District of Highlands, near Gowlland Tod Provincial Park and Goldstream Provincial Park, 14 km (9 mi) northwest of Victoria, being the highest mountain of the range.
