= Malahat, British Columbia =

Human settlement in Canada

Coordinates: 48°32′N 123°33′W

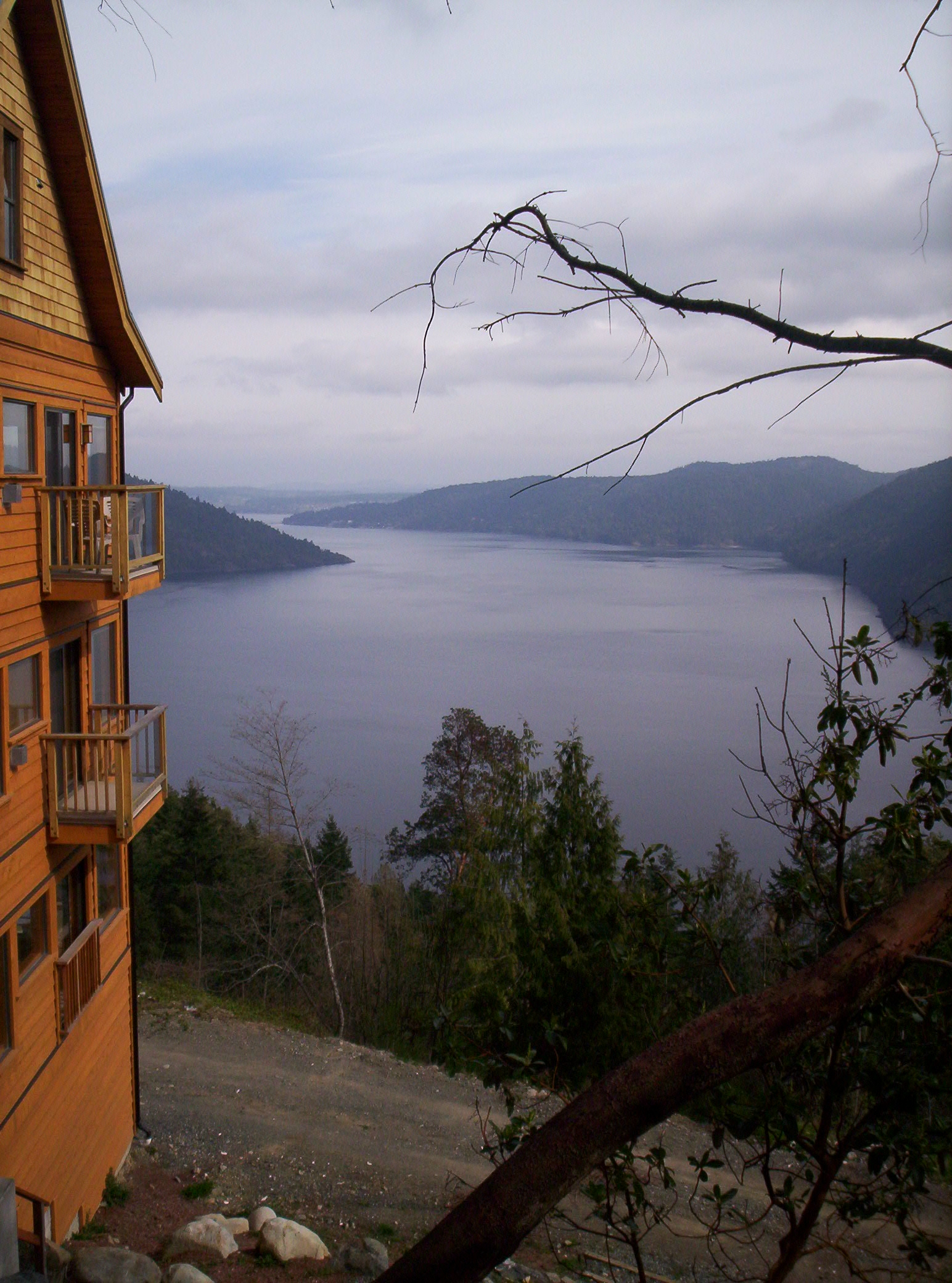
View from Malahat Lodge

Malahat (/ˈmæləhæt/) is an unincorporated area in the Cowichan Valley, with municipal-type services delivered by the Cowichan Valley Regional District (Area A). What could be considered the hub of the community is a small collection of businesses that includes the Malahat Gas station (which also serves as the Malahat Post Office), the Malahat Chalet, and the Moon Water Lodge.

A steep and rugged terrain has in the past precluded any significant residential development but new subdivisions are being built around the northern end of the area around the old Bamberton cement works and in the area adjoining Elkington Forest. Most area residents live in isolated homes located off the highway. In this context "Malahat" primarily refers to the Canada Post delivery district.

Fire protection to the Malahat area is provided by Malahat Fire Rescue.

== Malahat Drive ==
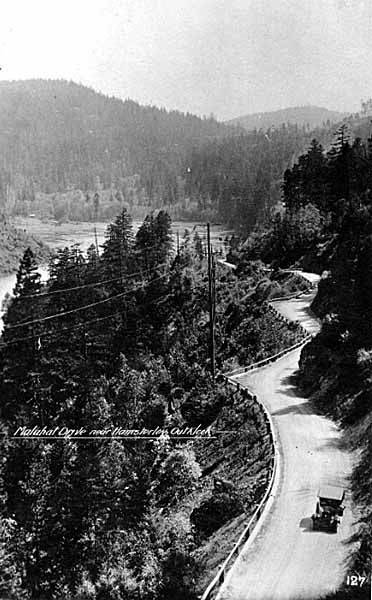
Malahat Drive, circa 1925

"The Malahat" is a term commonly applied to the Malahat Drive, a 25 km (15.5 mi) portion of Trans Canada Highway 1 running along the west side of Saanich Inlet and to the region surrounding it. The first connection between Greater Victoria and the Cowichan District was inland, and was cut as a cattle trail in 1861 and was then upgraded to wagon road standards in 1884. Today's Malahat Drive was opened in 1911, originally surfaced with gravel. Its name comes from the Malahat First Nation, whose ancestors used the caves for spiritual enhancement. The Malahat Drive climbs to a summit of 356 m (1,168 ft), and the mountain is considered one of the most sacred sites on southern Vancouver Island.

The roadway has a mix of 2, 3 and 4 lane cross-sections. The highway through the narrow Goldstream Provincial Park canyon section is 2 lanes.

The Malahat portion of Highway 1 has been the location of a number of fatal traffic accidents, caused largely by vehicles crossing the centre line. These accidents have led to lengthy road closures. Closure of Malahat Drive causes disruption to travel and commerce on Vancouver Island as portions of the highway are a single point of failure if closed. Detour routes around the Malahat Drive are available via the Brentwood Bay-Mill Bay ferry and the Pacific Marine Circle Route.

As a result of these crashes, the Ministry of Transportation has begun a program to add centre concrete medians to separate north and southbound traffic. Since the section between Finlayson Arm Road to Summit has had a median added, 65% of Malahat Drive is divided with a concrete median.

The speed limit of this highway segment is 80 km/h (50 mph) except for a short section of Tunnel Hill where the speed limit is 70 km/h (43 mph).
