= Saanich Inlet =

Inlet on the coast of British Columbia, Canada

- French: Baie Saanich
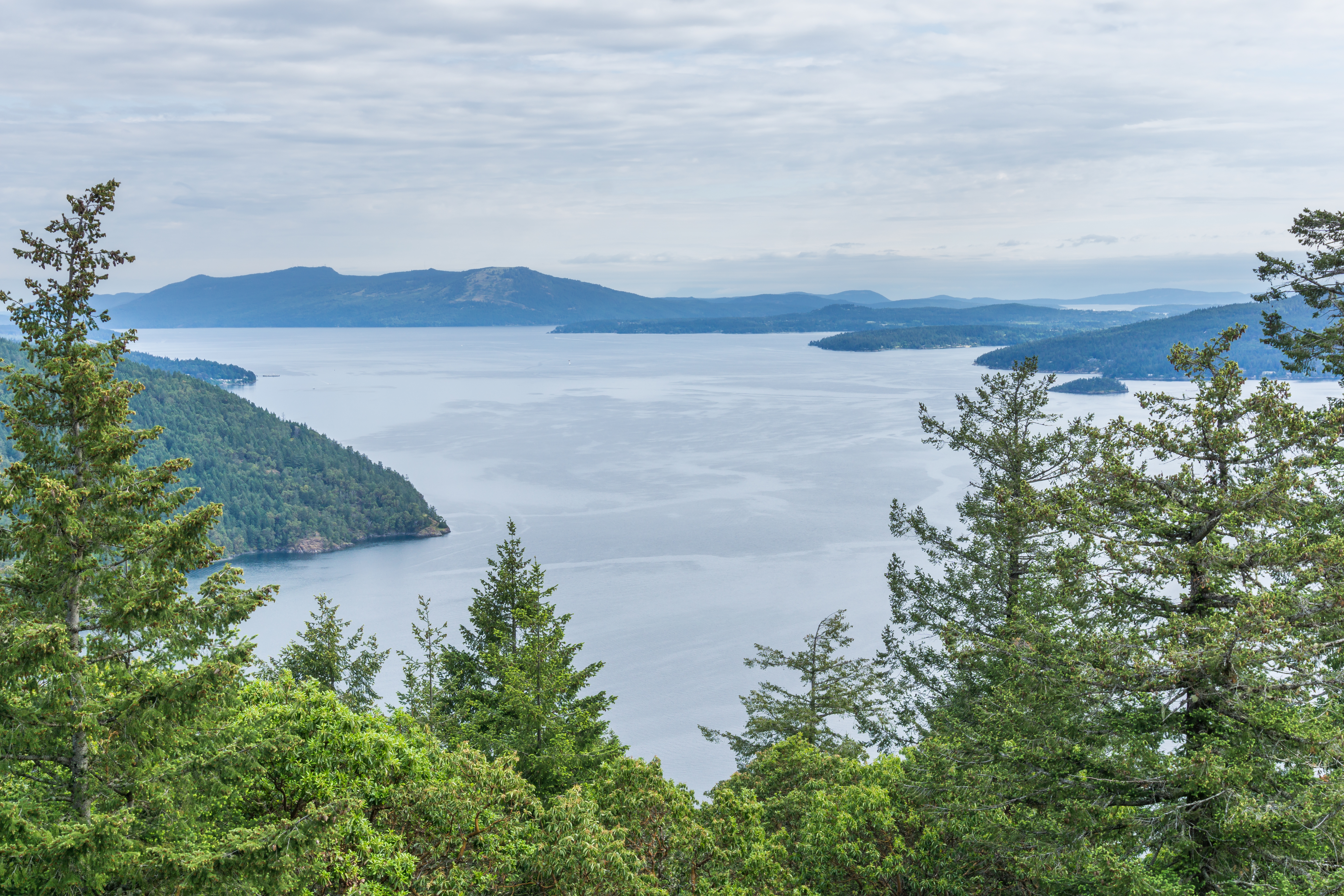
- Saanich Inlet from Gowlland Tod Provincial Park

- Location within British Columbia
- Location: Northwest of Victoria, British Columbia
- Coordinates: 48°37′33″N 123°30′26″W
- Type: Fjord
- River sources: Goldstream River
- Basin countries: Canada
- Max. length: 25 km (16 mi)
- Surface area: 67 km^{2} (26 sq mi)
- Max. depth: 226 m (741 ft)

Saanich Inlet (also Saanich Arm) is a body of salt water that lies between the Saanich Peninsula and the Malahat highlands of Vancouver Island, British Columbia, Canada. Located just northwest of Victoria, the inlet is 25 km (16 mi) long, has a surface area of 67 km^{2} (26 sq mi), and its maximum depth is 226 m (741 ft). It extends from Satellite Channel in the north (separating Salt Spring Island from the Saanich Peninsula) to Squally Reach and Finlayson Arm in the south. The only major tributary feeding the inlet is the Goldstream River.

The inlet has been of importance as a fishery to the Malahat and Saanich First Nations for centuries, and many First Nation reserves are situated on the shoreline. Since the arrival of Europeans, the inlet has also provided a recreational and commercial fishery. It has also been popular with scuba divers. For several years, a port existed on the western shore at Bamberton, servicing a cement works.

For most of the year the deep waters are anoxic, and hydrogen sulphide (H_{2}S) is often detected near the bottom. In the late summer and early fall, oxygenated waters from the Haro Strait and the Satellite Channel spill over into the deep basin of Saanich Inlet.

== Bays and inlets ==
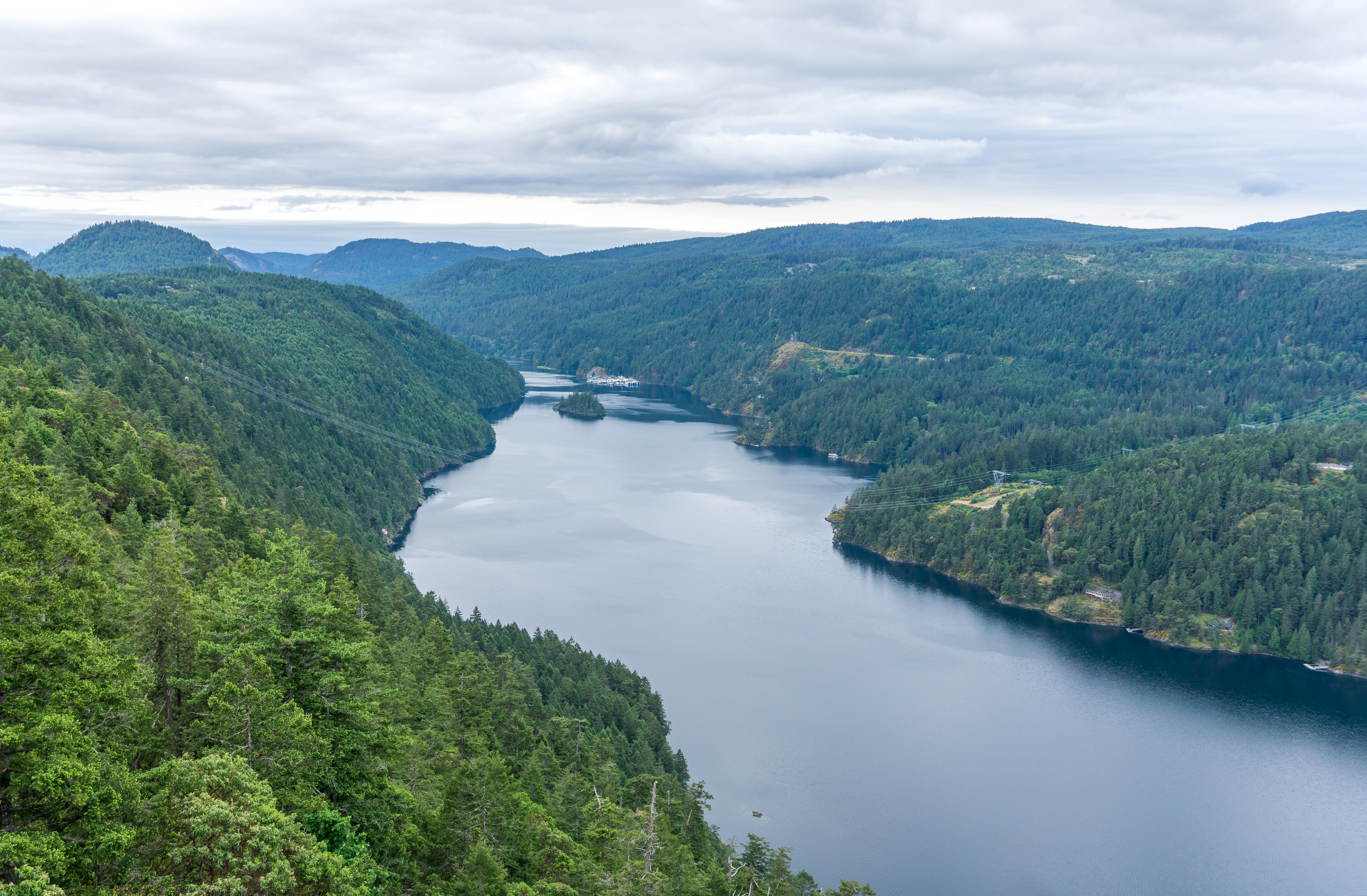
Finlayson Arm

Notable bays and inlets adjacent to Saanich Inlet include:

- Brentwood Bay, a calm, sheltered bay on the east side of the Inlet, with a small ferry service to Mill Bay.
  - Tod Inlet, a smaller inlet off the southwest corner of Brentwood Bay with water access to the northeast corner of Gowlland Tod Provincial Park and the rural community of Willis Point, as well as a private dock at the adjacent world-famous Butchart Gardens.
  - Confusingly, Brentwood College School is not located in Brentwood Bay, but rather across the inlet in Mill Bay.
- Coles Bay
- Deep Cove
- Finlayson Arm, a long narrow arm on the south of the Inlet draining Goldstream River at Goldstream Provincial Park. It is named for Roderick Finlayson (1818–1892). The scenic and steep Malahat Drive is on the west side of Finlayson Arm, while Gowlland Tod Provincial Park is on its east.
- Mill Bay, a calm bay and community centre on the west side of the Inlet. The ferry to Brentwood Bay allows a way of travelling to Greater Victoria than avoiding the steep Malahat Drive.
- Patricia Bay, a very deep bay and home to the Institute of Ocean Sciences research facility.
- Squally Reach, an east–west channel connecting the main Saanich Inlet to the north and Finlayson Arm to the south.
  - McKenzie Bight, an easy to sail bight on the east side of Saanich Inlet where its meets Squally Reach.

Other notable features around the inlet are:

- Mount Finlayson
- Bamberton

== See also ==
- List of fjords in Canada
- MV Mill Bay
- Hypoxia (environmental)
