= Greater Victoria =

Metropolitan area in British Columbia, Canada

- Metropolitan area
Interactive map of Greater Victoria, BC
City of Victoria
District Municipality of Saanich
Other Core Areas of the Victoria CMA
Saanich Peninsula Municipalities
West Shore Municipalities
- Location within Vancouver Island Location within British Columbia
- Coordinates: 48.511°N 123.413°W
- Country: Canada
- Province: British Columbia

Area (2021)
  - Total: 696.15 km^{2} (268.79 sq mi)

Population (2021)
  - Total: 397,237
  - Estimate (2025): 441,491
  - Rank: 12th in Canada
  - Density: 571.3/km^{2} (1,480/sq mi)

Gross Metropolitan Product
  - Victoria CMA: CDN$27 billion
- Time zone: UTC-7 (PCT)

Greater Victoria (also known as the Greater Victoria Region) is located in British Columbia, Canada, on the southern tip of Vancouver Island. It is usually defined as the thirteen municipalities of the Capital Regional District (CRD) on Vancouver Island as well as some adjacent areas and nearby islands.

The Capital Regional District administers some aspects of public administration for the whole metro region; other aspects are administered by the individual member municipalities of Greater Victoria. Roughly, Greater Victoria consists of all land and nearby islands east of a line drawn from the southern end of Finlayson Arm to the eastern shore of Sooke Harbour, along with some lands on the northern shore of Sooke Harbour.

Many places, buildings, and institutions associated with Victoria such as the University of Victoria, Victoria International Airport, and BC Ferries Swartz Bay ferry terminal, are outside the City of Victoria itself, which has an area of just 19.5 km^{2} (7.5 sq mi) on the southern tip of Greater Victoria. Victoria is the locality indicated in the mailing addresses of several CRD municipalities and localities adjacent to Victoria. The central city of Victoria lends its name and cultural influence to many places and organizations in the metro region.

== Municipalities ==
There are 13 cities, towns, and district municipalities in Greater Victoria. A merger of municipalities has been proposed since 2014 and considered by several governments, but has yet to advance to a plebiscite.

- Core municipalities
  - The City of Victoria, the adjacent district municipalities of Saanich, Esquimalt and Oak Bay, and the town of View Royal.
- West Shore
  - The cities of Colwood and Langford and the district municipalities of Highlands, Metchosin, and Sooke, which lie generally west of Esquimalt Harbour and Portage Inlet.
- Saanich Peninsula
  - The district municipalities of Central Saanich, North Saanich, parts of Saanich, and the town of Sidney, which lie to the north of Victoria.

This breakdown is roughly mirrored by the three school districts in Greater Victoria.

- Greater Victoria School District #61 - (the core municipalities)
- Sooke School District #62 - (the Western Communities)
- Saanich School District #63 - (the Saanich Peninsula)

Greater Victoria is the southernmost urban area in Western Canada; it is located south of the 49th parallel.

=== Neighbourhoods ===
This list is similar to, but not identical with, that used by the Greater Victoria real estate sales industry. Neighbourhoods with official status are italicized. Others may have no official definition, hence other lists of neighbourhoods in the Victoria area may differ. Other sources may give different boundaries as well.

- Victoria
  - Burnside-Gorge
    - Rock Bay
  - Downtown
    - Chinatown
  - Fairfield-Gonzales
    - Cook Street Village
    - Humboldt Valley
    - Gonzales
  - Fernwood
  - Harris Green
  - Hillside-Quadra
    - Blanshard
    - Quadra Village
    - Mayfair
  - James Bay
  - Jubilee
    - North Jubilee
    - South Jubilee
  - North Park
  - Oaklands
  - Rockland
  - Victoria West
- Saanich
  - Blenkinsop
  - Cadboro Bay
    - Queenswood
    - Ten Mile Point
  - Carey
    - Glanford
    - Marigold
  - Cordova Bay
  - Gordon Head
    - Arbutus
    - Mount Douglas
  - North Quadra
  - Quadra
    - Cedar Hill
    - Lake Hill
    - Maplewood
  - Royal Oak
    - Broadmead-Sunnymead
  - Rural Saanich
    - Beaver Lake
    - Elk Lake
    - Interurban
    - Prospect Lake
    - Strawberry Vale
    - West Burnside
  - Saanich Core
  - Shelbourne
    - Mount Tolmie
  - Tillicum
    - The Gorge
- Oak Bay
  - Gonzales (Foul Bay)
  - Uplands
  - Willows Beach
  - Windsor Park
  - South Oak Bay
  - North Oak Bay
  - Estevan
- Esquimalt
  - Craigflower
  - Colville Road
  - Gorge Vale
  - Parklands
  - Rockheights
  - Saxe Point
  - Songhees
  - West Bay
  - Work Point (DND)
- View Royal
  - Shoreline
- Colwood
  - Belmont Park
  - Colwood Corners
  - Hatley Park
  - Mill Hill
  - Royal Roads
  - Royal Bay
  - Triangle Mountain
- Langford
  - North
    - Bear Mountain
    - Florence Lake
    - Millstream
    - Thetis Heights
  - South
    - Glen Lake
    - Goldstream Meadows
    - Luxton
    - Ravenwood
    - Westhills
- Highlands
  - Durrance Lake
  - Thetis Lake
  - Willis Point
- Metchosin
  - Happy Valley
  - Matheson Lake
  - Rocky Point
  - William Head
- Central Saanich
  - Brentwood Bay
  - Island View
  - Saanichton
- North Saanich
  - Cloake Hill
  - Dean Park
  - Deep Cove
  - Lands End
  - Patricia Bay ("Pat Bay")
  - Swartz Bay
  - Ardmore
- Sidney
- Sooke
  - Broom Hill
  - East Sooke
  - Otter Point
  - Kemp Lake
  - Sooke Town Centre
  - Sunriver
  - Saseenos
  - Whiffin Spit

== Climate ==
Climate data for Victoria (Gonzales Heights) Climate ID: 1018610; coordinates 48°24′47″N 123°19′30″W; elevation: 69.5 m (228 ft); 1991–2020 normals, extremes 1898–present (Note: Climate data for Victoria was recorded at Gonzales Heights from August 1898 to present.)
Month	Jan	Feb	Mar	Apr	May	Jun	Jul	Aug	Sep	Oct	Nov	Dec	Year
Record high °C (°F)	17.1 (62.8)	17.4 (63.3)	23.6 (74.5)	27.0 (80.6)	31.6 (88.9)	39.8 (103.6)	36.0 (96.8)	33.4 (92.1)	31.7 (89.1)	25.3 (77.5)	18.9 (66.0)	15.0 (59.0)	39.8 (103.6)
Mean maximum °C (°F)	13.2 (55.8)	12.5 (54.5)	16.4 (61.5)	20.1 (68.2)	24.4 (75.9)	27.3 (81.1)	29.3 (84.7)	28.9 (84.0)	25.8 (78.4)	19.8 (67.6)	14.5 (58.1)	12.4 (54.3)	29.3 (84.7)
Mean daily maximum °C (°F)	7.8 (46.0)	8.6 (47.5)	10.7 (51.3)	13.5 (56.3)	16.5 (61.7)	18.7 (65.7)	20.6 (69.1)	20.7 (69.3)	18.9 (66.0)	13.9 (57.0)	9.9 (49.8)	7.5 (45.5)	14 (57)
Daily mean °C (°F)	5.8 (42.4)	6.1 (43.0)	7.7 (45.9)	10 (50)	12.6 (54.7)	14.6 (58.3)	16.3 (61.3)	16.4 (61.5)	15 (59)	11.1 (52.0)	7.7 (45.9)	5.5 (41.9)	10.7 (51.3)
Mean daily minimum °C (°F)	3.8 (38.8)	3.6 (38.5)	4.6 (40.3)	6.4 (43.5)	8.7 (47.7)	10.5 (50.9)	11.9 (53.4)	12.1 (53.8)	11 (52)	8.2 (46.8)	5.4 (41.7)	3.6 (38.5)	7.5 (45.5)
Mean minimum °C (°F)	−5.8 (21.6)	−4.2 (24.4)	−2.3 (27.9)	−0.3 (31.5)	2.4 (36.3)	5.8 (42.4)	7.9 (46.2)	7.9 (46.2)	4.7 (40.5)	0.8 (33.4)	−2.5 (27.5)	−4.9 (23.2)	−5.8 (21.6)
Record low °C (°F)	−14.4 (6.1)	−12.8 (9.0)	−7.2 (19.0)	−2.2 (28.0)	1.1 (34.0)	3.9 (39.0)	6.1 (43.0)	4.4 (39.9)	1.7 (35.1)	−2.8 (27.0)	−11.1 (12.0)	−15.6 (3.9)	−15.6 (3.9)
Average precipitation mm (inches)	110.6 (4.35)	60.7 (2.39)	62.4 (2.46)	36.2 (1.43)	27.5 (1.08)	18.8 (0.74)	13 (0.5)	16.4 (0.65)	27.8 (1.09)	85.4 (3.36)	128.7 (5.07)	87.2 (3.43)	674.9 (26.57)
Average precipitation days (≥ 0.2 mm)	20.6	15.5	18.3	12.4	10.4	8.5	4.8	5	9.1	15.2	20.6	18.5	158.9
Mean monthly sunshine hours	74.1	93.7	149.5	201.5	266.6	273.8	327.8	297.3	204.1	153.4	83.1	68.7	2,193.3
Percentage possible sunshine	27.1	32.6	40.6	49.2	56.6	56.9	67.5	66.9	53.9	45.6	29.9	26.4	46.1
Average ultraviolet index	1	1	3	4	6	7	7	6	5	3	1	1	4
Source 1: Environment and Climate Change Canada (June maximum) (July maximum) (October maximum)
Source 2: Weather Atlas

Climate data for University of Victoria (Oak Bay / Saanich) WMO ID: 71783; coordinates 48°27′25″N 123°18′17″W; elevation: 60.1 m (197 ft); 1991–2020 normals
Month	Jan	Feb	Mar	Apr	May	Jun	Jul	Aug	Sep	Oct	Nov	Dec	Year
Record high humidex	19.6	16.6	21.9	25.3	31.3	41.9	40.4	35.0	33.4	31.1	20.5	20.9	40.4
Record high °C (°F)	15.2 (59.4)	16.5 (61.7)	21.0 (69.8)	25.0 (77.0)	28.8 (83.8)	37.9 (100.2)	37.6 (99.7)	34.5 (94.1)	30.2 (86.4)	23.5 (74.3)	19.0 (66.2)	16.5 (61.7)	37.6 (99.7)
Mean maximum °C (°F)	12.7 (54.9)	13.2 (55.8)	16.1 (61.0)	20.0 (68.0)	25.4 (77.7)	27.8 (82.0)	30.1 (86.2)	29.8 (85.6)	26.2 (79.2)	19.6 (67.3)	15.0 (59.0)	12.7 (54.9)	31.7 (89.1)
Mean daily maximum °C (°F)	8.2 (46.8)	8.8 (47.8)	11.0 (51.8)	14.0 (57.2)	17.9 (64.2)	20.6 (69.1)	23.7 (74.7)	23.5 (74.3)	20.0 (68.0)	14.3 (57.7)	10.3 (50.5)	8.0 (46.4)	15.0 (59.0)
Daily mean °C (°F)	5.8 (42.4)	5.9 (42.6)	7.5 (45.5)	9.8 (49.6)	12.9 (55.2)	15.4 (59.7)	17.7 (63.9)	17.7 (63.9)	15.0 (59.0)	10.7 (51.3)	7.6 (45.7)	5.5 (41.9)	11.0 (51.8)
Mean daily minimum °C (°F)	3.4 (38.1)	2.9 (37.2)	3.9 (39.0)	5.5 (41.9)	7.9 (46.2)	10.2 (50.4)	11.7 (53.1)	11.8 (53.2)	10.1 (50.2)	7.2 (45.0)	4.7 (40.5)	3.1 (37.6)	6.9 (44.4)
Mean minimum °C (°F)	−2.3 (27.9)	−2.1 (28.2)	−0.8 (30.6)	1.1 (34.0)	3.5 (38.3)	6.5 (43.7)	8.6 (47.5)	8.9 (48.0)	6.1 (43.0)	2.2 (36.0)	−1.2 (29.8)	−2.8 (27.0)	−5.4 (22.3)
Record low °C (°F)	−11.7 (10.9)	−7.2 (19.0)	−4.1 (24.6)	−0.6 (30.9)	0.2 (32.4)	5.1 (41.2)	6.2 (43.2)	7.2 (45.0)	3.6 (38.5)	−2.1 (28.2)	−9.5 (14.9)	−11.2 (11.8)	−11.2 (11.8)
Record low wind chill	−15.4	−11.8	−9.0	−1.7	0.0	0.0	0.0	0.0	0.0	−3.3	−12.4	−14.5	−15.4
Average precipitation mm (inches)	109.6 (4.31)	59.6 (2.35)	52.6 (2.07)	35.6 (1.40)	29.2 (1.15)	19.7 (0.78)	10.7 (0.42)	15.6 (0.61)	30.4 (1.20)	77.2 (3.04)	123.2 (4.85)	97.8 (3.85)	661.2 (26.03)
Average precipitation days (≥ 0.2 mm)	18.7	15.1	17.2	13.2	11.2	9.1	4.8	5.2	11.1	17.8	21.4	19.3	164.0
Average relative humidity (%) (at 1500 LST)	83.3	75.5	70.5	63.8	60.8	58.0	55.5	57.8	65.7	76.6	81.9	82.8	69.3
Average dew point °C (°F)	3.8 (38.8)	3.1 (37.6)	4.1 (39.4)	5.5 (41.9)	8.0 (46.4)	10.0 (50.0)	11.9 (53.4)	12.4 (54.3)	11.1 (52.0)	8.4 (47.1)	5.6 (42.1)	3.6 (38.5)	7.3 (45.1)
Source 1: Environment and Climate Change Canada
Source 2: weatherstats.ca (for dewpoint and monthly&yearly average absolute maximum&minimum temperature)

Climate data for North Saanich (Victoria International Airport) WMO ID: 1018620; coordinates 48°38′50″N 123°25′33″W; elevation: 19.5 m (64 ft); 1991–2020 normals, extremes 1940–present
Month	Jan	Feb	Mar	Apr	May	Jun	Jul	Aug	Sep	Oct	Nov	Dec	Year
Record high humidex	17.4	17.1	21.1	26.1	33.6	34.7	39.6	36.8	34.7	27.0	20.0	17.7	42.6
Record high °C (°F)	16.1 (61.0)	18.3 (64.9)	21.4 (70.5)	26.3 (79.3)	31.5 (88.7)	39.4 (102.9)	36.3 (97.3)	34.4 (93.9)	31.2 (88.2)	27.6 (81.7)	18.3 (64.9)	16.8 (62.2)	39.4 (102.9)
Mean daily maximum °C (°F)	7.5 (45.5)	8.7 (47.7)	10.8 (51.4)	13.7 (56.7)	17.5 (63.5)	20.2 (68.4)	22.7 (72.9)	22.6 (72.7)	19.7 (67.5)	14.3 (57.7)	9.9 (49.8)	7.3 (45.1)	14.6 (58.3)
Daily mean °C (°F)	4.6 (40.3)	5.0 (41.0)	6.8 (44.2)	9.1 (48.4)	12.6 (54.7)	15.2 (59.4)	17.2 (63.0)	17.1 (62.8)	14.5 (58.1)	10.2 (50.4)	6.5 (43.7)	4.4 (39.9)	10.3 (50.5)
Mean daily minimum °C (°F)	1.6 (34.9)	1.4 (34.5)	2.7 (36.9)	4.6 (40.3)	7.6 (45.7)	10.1 (50.2)	11.7 (53.1)	11.6 (52.9)	9.2 (48.6)	6.0 (42.8)	3.0 (37.4)	1.5 (34.7)	5.9 (42.6)
Record low °C (°F)	−15.6 (3.9)	−15.0 (5.0)	−10.0 (14.0)	−3.9 (25.0)	−1.1 (30.0)	2.1 (35.8)	4.1 (39.4)	4.4 (39.9)	−1.1 (30.0)	−4.4 (24.1)	−13.3 (8.1)	−14.4 (6.1)	−15.6 (3.9)
Record low wind chill	−19.1	−23.7	−13.9	−6.7	−5.3	0.0	0.0	0.0	0.0	−9.1	−19.4	−25.1	−25.1
Average precipitation mm (inches)	155.3 (6.11)	84.5 (3.33)	79.9 (3.15)	48.2 (1.90)	36.5 (1.44)	29.2 (1.15)	19.5 (0.77)	24.2 (0.95)	35.7 (1.41)	96.1 (3.78)	146.0 (5.75)	146.1 (5.75)	901.2 (35.48)
Average rainfall mm (inches)	144.2 (5.68)	78.5 (3.09)	76.3 (3.00)	47.7 (1.88)	36.5 (1.44)	29.2 (1.15)	19.5 (0.77)	24.2 (0.95)	35.7 (1.41)	95.9 (3.78)	141.8 (5.58)	137.0 (5.39)	866.6 (34.12)
Average snowfall cm (inches)	11.2 (4.4)	7.1 (2.8)	3.7 (1.5)	0.5 (0.2)	0.0 (0.0)	0.0 (0.0)	0.0 (0.0)	0.0 (0.0)	0.0 (0.0)	0.2 (0.1)	3.6 (1.4)	12.4 (4.9)	38.6 (15.2)
Average precipitation days (≥ 0.2 mm)	19.8	15.2	17.0	13.7	11.6	9.5	5.4	5.5	8.0	14.1	18.9	19.4	158.1
Average rainy days (≥ 0.2 mm)	18.9	14.5	16.8	13.7	11.6	9.5	5.4	5.5	8.0	14.0	18.5	19.0	155.5
Average snowy days (≥ 0.2 cm)	2.0	1.6	1.2	0.1	0.0	0.0	0.0	0.0	0.0	0.0	0.9	1.7	7.4
Average relative humidity (%) (at 1500 LST)	78.4	69.9	65.3	60.5	58.4	56.3	55.4	56.4	60.7	69.7	76.6	79.3	65.6
Mean monthly sunshine hours	70.8	95.5	145.3	191.3	241.5	251.7	318.1	297.5	228.6	136.9	72.8	58.9	2,108.8
Percentage possible sunshine	26	33.3	39.5	46.7	51.2	52.2	65.4	66.9	60.3	40.7	26.2	22.7	44.3
Source: Environment and Climate Change Canada (June maximum) (sun 1981–2010)

== Demographics ==
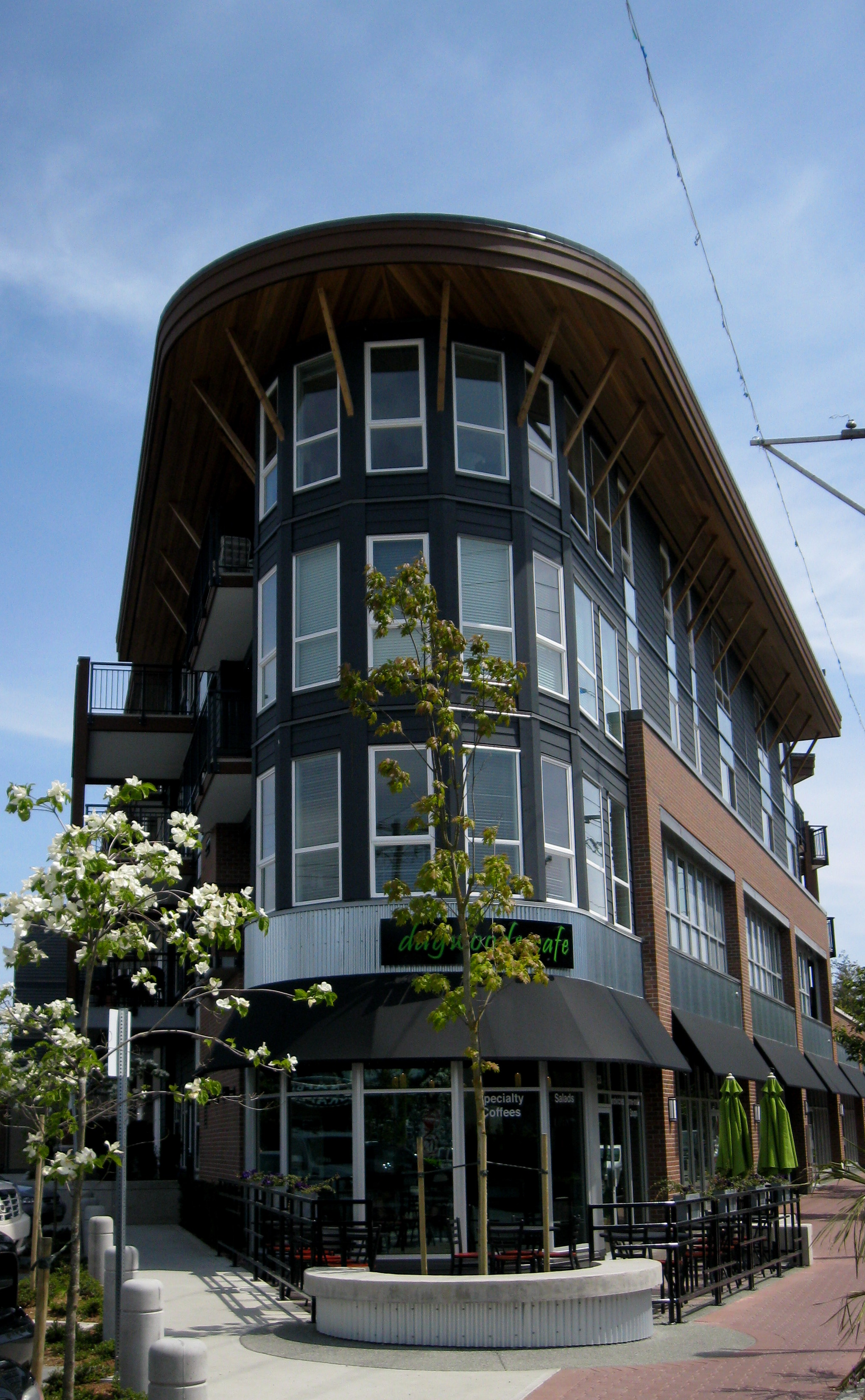
The Granderson building facade, Langford

The Greater Victoria region has a combined population of 397,237 according to the 2021 Canadian census. The region comprises two of the fifteen most populous municipalities in British Columbia (Saanich, at number seven, and Victoria at number thirteen). The Canadian census ranks Greater Victoria as the 12th largest population centre in Canada. The combined population of the cities, municipalities, unincorporated areas and First Nations reserves in the region are as follows:

Division	Census Subdivision type	Population (2021)
Saanich	District municipality	117,735
Victoria	City	91,867
Langford	City	46,584
Colwood	City	18,961
Oak Bay	District municipality	17,990
Esquimalt	Town	17,533
Central Saanich	District municipality	17,385
Sooke	District municipality	15,086
Sidney	Town	12,318
North Saanich	District municipality	12,235
View Royal	Town	11,575
Juan de Fuca (Part 1)	Regional district electoral area	5,132
Metchosin	District municipality	5,067
Highlands	District municipality	2,482
New Songhees 1A	Indian reserve	1,839
East Saanich 2	Indian reserve	1,790
South Saanich 1	Indian reserve	712
Cole Bay 3	Indian reserve	266
T'Sou-ke	Indian reserve	230
Becher Bay 1	Indian reserve	221
Esquilmalt 1	Indian reserve	120
Union Bay 4	Indian reserve	109

=== Ethnicity ===
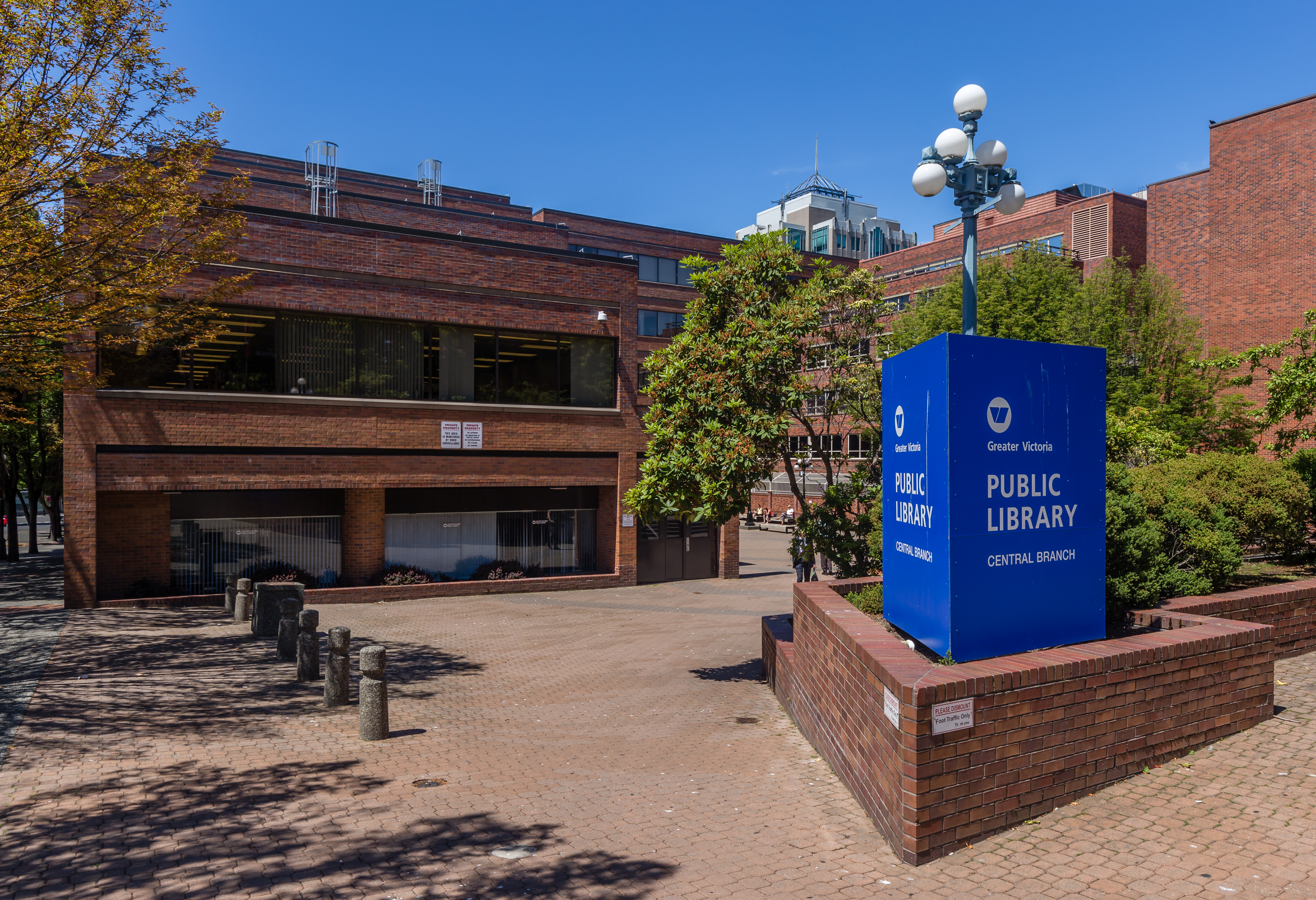
Central Branch of Greater Victoria Public Library

Largest ethnic origin in Victoria CMA by census tract based on the 2021 census

In comparison to the Lower Mainland (Vancouver and environs), the region does not have a great deal of racial diversity. Most of the population is of Euro-Canadian descent. A substantial community of those of Chinese descent has existed in Greater Victoria since the Fraser Canyon Gold Rush of 1858–60, which saw the first significant influx, arriving first via San Francisco then directly from China. There is also a substantial First Nations (Indigenous) population whose ancestors have lived in the area for thousands of years. Numerous First Nations reserves, forming distinct communities, exist in the region — primarily on the Saanich Peninsula, in Esquimalt, and in the Western Communities — although the majority of the First Nations population live off-reserve.

As of 2021, approximately 76.6% of Greater Victoria's population were White, while 4.9% were Indigenous, and 16.3% were visible minorities (lower than the national percentage of 26.5%).

Panethnic groups in the Greater Victoria area (2021)

Panethnic group	2021	
Panethnic group	Pop.	%
European (Note: Statistic includes all persons that did not make up part of a visible minority or an indigenous identity.)	304,235	76.59%
African	5,085	1.28%
South Asian	13,720	3.45%
Indigenous	19,460	4.90%
East Asian (Note: Statistic includes total responses of "Chinese", "Korean", and "Japanese" under visible minority section on census.)	23,025	5.80%
Middle Eastern (Note: Statistic includes total responses of "West Asian" and "Arab" under visible minority section on census.)	3,505	0.88%
Southeast Asian (Note: Statistic includes total responses of "Filipino" and "Southeast Asian" under visible minority section on census.)	12,335	3.10%
Latin American	3,940	0.99%
Other/Multiracial (Note: Statistic includes total responses of "Visible minority, n.i.e." and "Multiple visible minorities" under visible minority section on census.)	3,170	0.80%
Total responses	388,475	97.79%
Total population	397,237	100%

=== Immigration ===
The 2021 census reported that immigrants (individuals born outside Canada) comprise 50,595 persons or 18.5% of the total population of Greater Victoria. Of the total immigrant population, the top countries of origin were United Kingdom (15,185 persons or 20.7%), United States of America (6,505 persons or 8.9%), China (6,480 persons or 8.8%), Philippines (6,140 persons or 8.4%), India (4,875 persons or 6.6%), Germany (2,615 persons or 3.6%), Netherlands (1,500 persons or 2.0%), South Korea (1,345 persons or 1.8%), South Africa (1,245 persons or 1.7%), and Hong Kong (1,195 persons or 1.6%).

=== Religion ===
According to the 2021 census, religious groups in Greater Victoria included:

- Irreligion (234,855 persons or 60.5%)
- Christianity (126,855 persons or 32.7%)
- Sikhism (5,160 persons or 1.3%)
- Islam (4,975 persons or 1.3%)
- Buddhism (4,090 persons or 1.1%)
- Hinduism (3,105 persons or 0.8%)
- Judaism (2,745 persons or 0.7%)
- Indigenous Spirituality (755 persons or 0.2%)
- Other (5,940 persons or 1.5%)

=== Language ===
Mother tongue language (2021)

Rank	Language	Population	Pct (%)
1	English	321,890	86.43%
2	Mandarin	6,505	1.66%
3	French	6,160	1.57%
4	Cantonese	4,805	1.23%
5	Punjabi	4,340	1.11%
6	Tagalog	4,125	1.05%
7	Spanish	3,885	0.99%
8	German	3,715	0.95%
9	Korean	1,895	0.48%
10	Portuguese	1,740	0.44%

== Culture ==
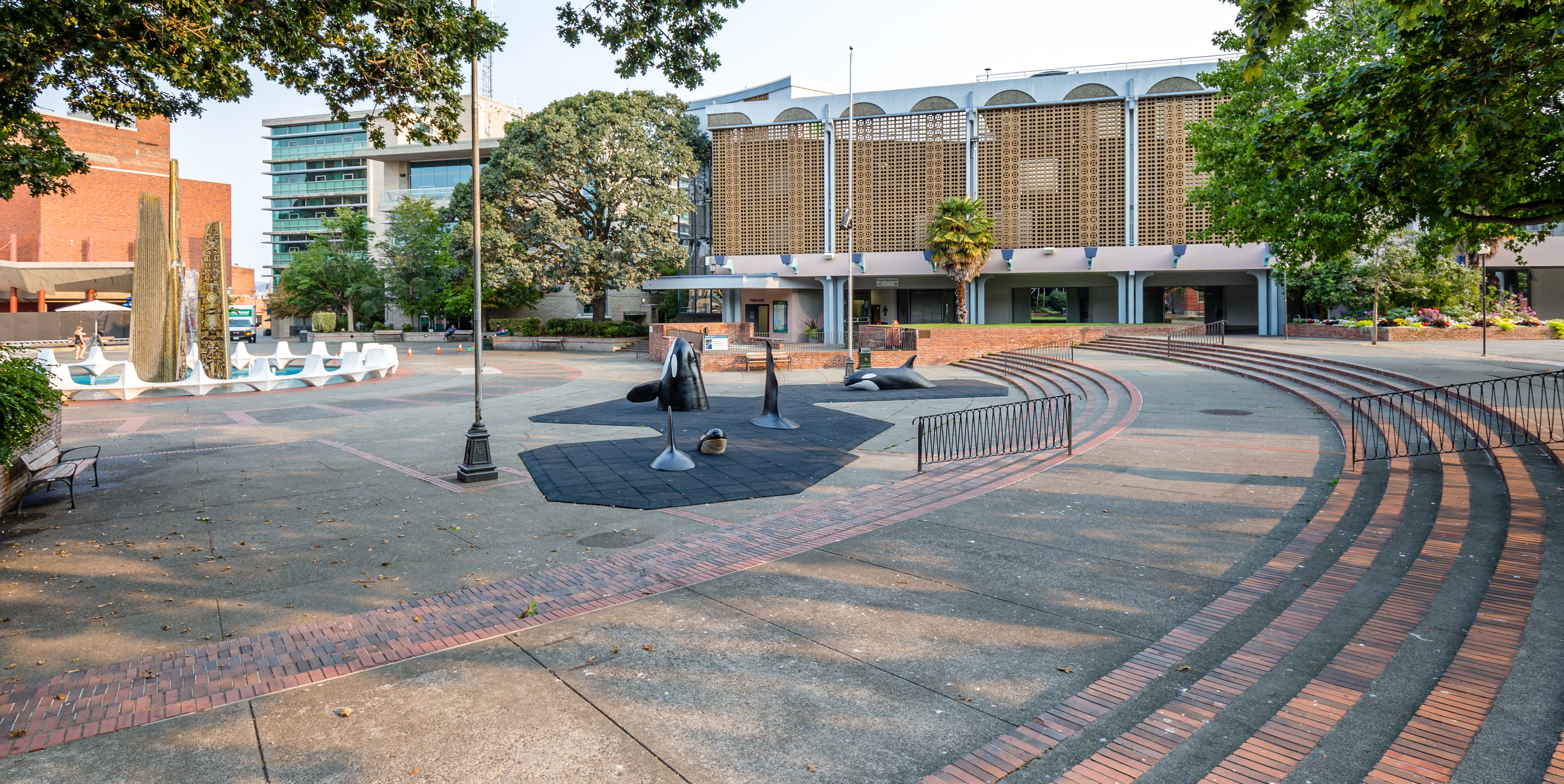
Centennial Square

Many Victoria Region municipalities have their own fairs: Oak Bay's Tea Party, Esquimalt's Buccaneer Days, Sidney's Sidney Days, Sooke's Sooke Days, Western Communities' Luxton Rodeo, and Central Saanich's Saanich Fair. The Saanich Fair is the oldest and largest of all the Greater Victoria local fair venues; it is considered a de facto regional fair because of its greater size, content, and famous reputation. The Saanich Fair has the largest number of attendees of all the Victoria area fairs.

There is a wide variety of entertainment and recreational facilities and activities. The mild coastal climate ensures less extreme weather changes. Outdoor and indoor recreational areas are abundant throughout the region. The Rifflandia Music Festival takes place in Downtown Victoria in mid to late September. The Victoria Tall Ships Festival showcase sailing vessels and the sailing life. The Victoria Symphony performs over 100 concerts a year, including the renowned Symphony Splash, an annual free concert in the Inner Harbour on the August Sunday preceding BC Day. The orchestra is on a barge playing to an audience of over 40,000. The Electronic Music Festival also takes place at Centennial Square where DJs can show off their music mixing skills.

These regional positive qualities, along with new transportation links, international high-profile events (2007 NATO meeting, 2007 FIFA U-20 World Cup, 1994 Commonwealth Games), could have helped produce a socio-economic effect in terms of: attractiveness as a place of residency, low unemployment, high real estate development potential for profit, increasing immigration of new people(s), and expanding opportunities for business or economic development. High-profile international attention performs its duty as a marketing, public relations, and sales catalyst for further activity. Boaters from around the world gather annually in the waters off of Vancouver Island for the Swiftsure Yacht Race.

An example of this economic opportunity also lies in Victoria's geography. The April 19, 2008 the Victoria Times Colonist newspaper printed a section, sponsored by the Downtown Victoria Business Association, focusing on the area's downtown selection of goods and service providers. As it was in the early days with merchants supplying and outfitting gold rush prospectors, today's modern merchants supply outdoor recreation seekers before they head to other parts of Vancouver Island for surfing, kayaking, hiking, camping, swimming, cycling or whatever activities they seek.

In June 2010, the Royal Canadian Navy celebrated its 100th anniversary with a fleet review in the waters off of Greater Victoria, by Canada's former Governor General Michaëlle Jean. The review was attended by warships from Canada, France, New Zealand, Australia, Japan, the United States along with United States Coast Guard and the Canadian Coast Guard vessels. These celebration activities coincided with the Esquimalt Buccaneer Days Fair and the 2010 FIFA World Cup activities in local bars.

The 2010 Olympic Torch Relay started in Greater Victoria and proceeded to other communities across Canada. The conclusion of the torch relay began the 2010 Winter Olympics in Vancouver.

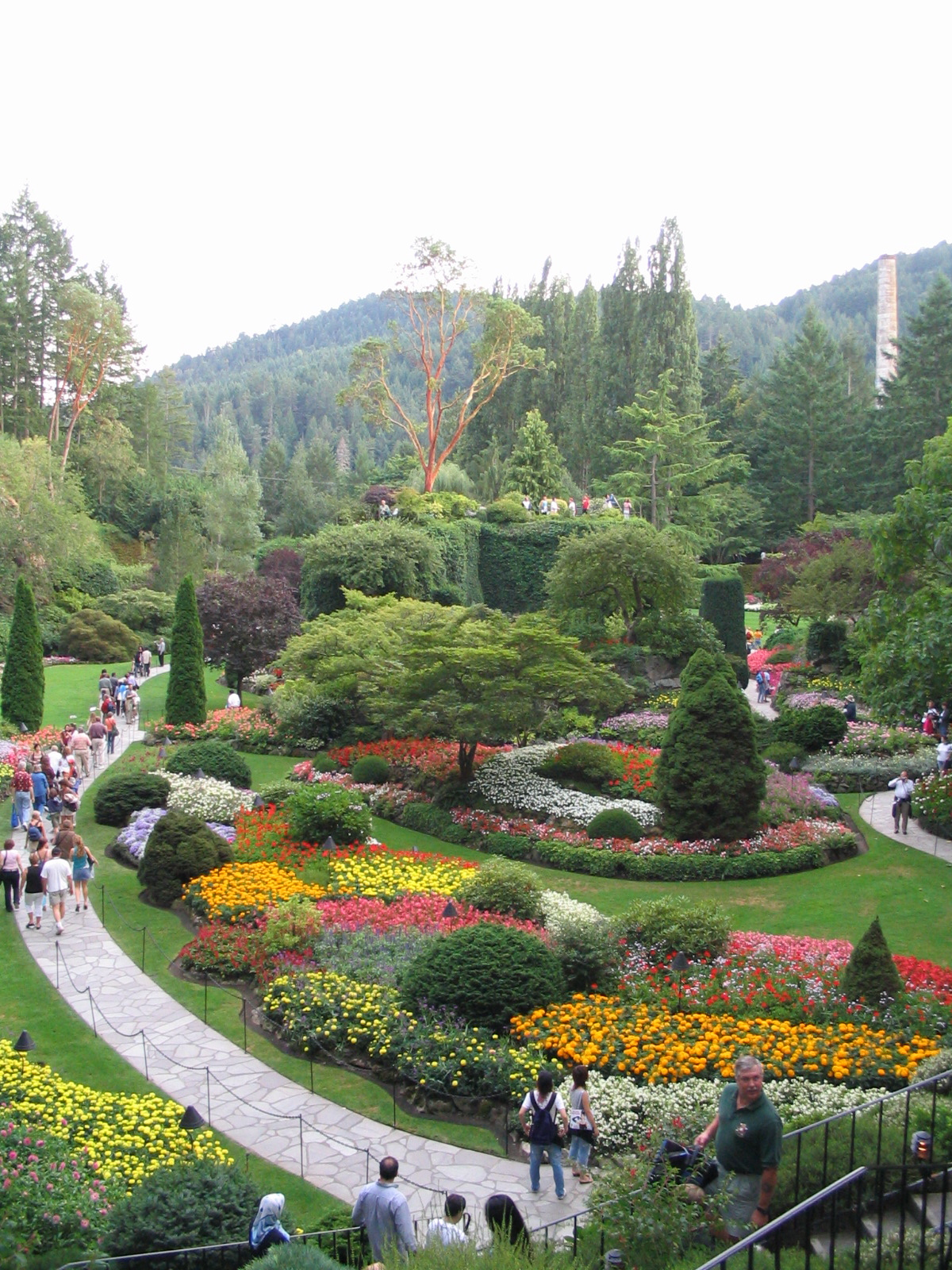
Victoria's world-famous Butchart Gardens are actually located in Central Saanich

== Notable places ==
=== Educational institutions ===
- Camosun College (Saanich and Oak Bay)
- Pearson College UWC (Metchosin)
- Royal Roads University (Colwood)
- University of Victoria (Saanich and Oak Bay)
- University Canada West (Victoria campus closed 2011)
- Vancouver Island School of Art (Victoria)
- Victoria College of Art (Victoria)
- Schools of alternative medicine
  - Oshio College of Acupuncture and Herbal Medicine
  - Pacific Rim College (Victoria)

=== Hospitals ===
- Royal Jubilee Hospital (Victoria and Saanich)
- Saanich Peninsula Hospital (Central Saanich/Saanich Peninsula)
- Victoria General Hospital (View Royal)

=== Military installations ===
(Department of National Defence)

- CFB Esquimalt HMC Dockyard (Esquimalt)
- CFB Esquimalt Naden (Esquimalt)
- CFB Esquimalt Rocky Point (Metchosin)
- CFB Esquimalt Albert Head (Metchosin)
- CFB Esquimalt Mary Hill (Metchosin)
- HMCS Malahat (Victoria)
- Bay Street Armoury (Victoria)
- Lieutenant General E.C. Ashton Armoury (Saanich)
- Victoria International Airport Air Force Squadron detachment (North Saanich)

=== Parks and natural features ===
- Beacon Hill Park (Victoria)
- Clover Point (Victoria)
- Dallas Road Waterfront Pathway (Victoria)
- Elk/Beaver Lake Regional Park (Saanich)
- Francis/King Regional Park (Saanich)
- Galloping Goose Regional Trail (from Victoria west through Sooke)
- ȽÁU, WELṈEW̱/John Dean Provincial Park (North Saanich and Central Saanich)
- Mount Douglas Park (Saanich)
- Moss Rock Park (Victoria)
- Ogden Point (Victoria)
- Rithet's Bog (Saanich)
- Sea to Sea Green Blue Belt
  - East Sooke Regional Park (Juan de Fuca EA)
  - Goldstream Provincial Park (Langford)
  - Gowlland Tod Provincial Park (Highlands, and Juan de Fuca EA)
  - Mount Work Regional Park (Saanich, Highlands, and Juan de Fuca EA)
  - Sooke Potholes Regional Park, Sooke Potholes Provincial Park and Sooke River Provincial Park (Sooke)
- Swan Lake / Christmas Hill Nature Sanctuary (Saanich)
- Thetis Lake Regional Park (View Royal, Langford, and Highlands)
- Uplands Park (Oak Bay)
  - Cattle Point (Uplands Park, Oak Bay)
- Saxe Point Park / Fleming Beach, former military defence gun bunkers/observation (Esquimalt)
- Hartland landfill (mountain biking, tours and hiking) (Saanich)
- Mount Tolmie (Saanich)

=== Scientific facilities ===
- Dominion Astrophysical Observatory / National Research Council Canada (Saanich)
- Gonzales Observatory for Atmospheric Biogeochemistry Research (Oak Bay)
- Institute of Ocean Sciences / Fisheries and Oceans Canada (North Saanich)
- Geological Survey of Canada, GSC Pacific / Natural Resources Canada (Sidney)
- Sidney Laboratory (Centre for Plant Health) / Canadian Food Inspection Agency (North Saanich)

=== Sites of interest ===
==== Historical ====
- Craigdarroch Castle (Victoria)
- Craigflower Manor and Schoolhouse (Saanich)
- The Empress (Victoria)
- Fort Rodd Hill and Fisgard Lighthouse / Parks Canada (Colwood)
- Hatley Park, Greater Victoria (Colwood)
- Ross Bay Cemetery (Victoria)
- Chinese Cemetery at Harling Point (Oak Bay)
- Veteran's Cemetery (Esquimalt)
- Chinatown (Victoria)
- Fleming Beach, historical defence bunkers (Esquimalt)
- Emily Carr House (Victoria)
- Victoria High School (Victoria)
- Camosun College (Saanich)
- Beacon Hill Park (Victoria)
- Helmcken House (Victoria)
- Victoria Police Department Station Museum (150 years of policing artifacts) (Victoria)
- Butchart Gardens (Central Saanich)

==== Political ====
- Government House (Victoria)
- Parliament Buildings (Victoria)
- Victoria City Hall (Victoria)

==== Cultural ====
- Art Gallery of Greater Victoria (Victoria)
- British Columbia Aviation Museum (Sidney)
- Esquimalt Naval and Military Museum (Esquimalt)
- Chinatown (Victoria)
- Maltwood Art Gallery (University of Victoria, University Centre, Saanich)
- Royal British Columbia Museum & IMAX National Geographic Theatre (Victoria)
- Shaw Centre for the Salish Sea (Sidney)
- Thunderbird Park (Victoria)

=== Sports facilities ===
- Notable Venues
  - Save-On-Foods Memorial Centre - Victoria Royals
  - Royal Athletic Park - Victoria HarbourCats, Touchdown Pacific
  - The Q Centre - Victoria Shamrocks, Victoria Grizzlies
  - Centennial Stadium - University of Victoria Vikes, 1994 Commonwealth Games
  - Starlight Stadium - Pacific FC, Rugby Canada, Westshore Rebels
  - CARSA Gymnasium - University of Victoria Vikes basketball
  - Saanich Commonwealth Place- 1994 Commonwealth Games

- Golf
  - Bear Mountain Golf Resort and Spa (Langford)
  - Cedar Hill Golf Course (Saanich)
  - Gorge Vale Golf Club (Esquimalt)
  - Olympic View Golf Club (Langford and Colwood)
  - Royal Colwood Golf and Country Club (Colwood)
  - Royal Oak Golf Club (Saanich)
  - Uplands Golf Club (Oak Bay)
  - Victoria Golf Club (Oak Bay)
  - Highland Pacific Golf (Saanich)
  - Prospect Lake Golf Course (Saanich)
  - Cordova Bay Golf Course (Saanich)
- Other
  - Gordon Head Recreation Centre (Saanich)
  - Cedar Hill Recreation Centre (Saanich)
  - Victoria City Rowing Club (Saanich)
  - Crystal Pool & Fitness Centre (Victoria)
  - George Pearkes Recreation Centre (Saanich)
  - Juan de Fuca Recreation Centre (Colwood)
  - Royal Victoria Yacht Club (Oak Bay)
  - Saanich Commonwealth Place (swimming pool and library-Greater Victoria Public Library) (Saanich)
  - Victoria Curling Club (Victoria)
  - Western Speedway (motor racing) (Langford)
  - Esquimalt Recreation Centre (Esquimalt)
  - Panorama Recreation Centre (North Saanich)
  - Oak Bay Recreation Centre (Oak Bay)
  - Eagle Ridge Community Centre (Langford)
  - City Centre Park (Langford)

=== Transportation and ports ===
- Highways

Greater Victoria is served by three provincial highways

  - Highway 17, connects Greater Victoria to Victoria International Airport and BC Ferries service to Vancouver. A four lane highway with mix of freeway, expressway and arterial standards.
  - Highway 1 (Trans-Canada Highway), connects the core eastern municipalities to the western municipalities as a 12 km (7.5 mi) freeway with seven interchanges.
  - Highway 14, connects Greater Victoria to Sooke, mostly a two lane highway.
- Ports
  - Puget Sound Navigation Company (to Port Angeles, Washington) (Victoria)
  - Island Rail Corridor terminus (Victoria)
  - Victoria Harbour (Victoria)
    - Victoria Inner Harbour Airport
  - Swartz Bay ferry terminal (BC Ferries to the Tsawwassen ferry terminal, near Vancouver) (North Saanich)
  - Victoria International Airport (North Saanich)
    - Victoria Airport Water Aerodrome
  - Washington State Ferries (Sidney, to the San Juan Islands and Anacortes, Washington)
  - Downtown Victoria, Victoria Harbour (Camel Point) Heliport at Ogden Point with Helijet helicopter service to Downtown Vancouver, (Victoria)
  - Victoria Harbour (Shoal Point) Heliport at Victoria Harbour's Middle Harbour

== Media outlets ==
=== Print ===
- Black Press
  - Victoria News, local media
  - Saanich News local media
  - Goldstream News Gazette, local media
  - Peninsula News Review, local media
  - Sooke News Mirror, local media
  - Oak Bay News, local media
- Other
  - Monday Magazine, entertainment weekly publication
  - Times Colonist, regional newspaper
  - The Nexus, Camosun College student newspaper
  - The Martlet, University of Victoria student newspaper
  - LookOut, newspaper of CFB Esquimalt
  - Victoria Marketplace, monthly business profiles
  - Douglas Magazine, Victoria based business magazine

=== Social media communities ===
- Black Press
  - Victoria News
  - Saanich News
  - Goldstream News Gazette
  - Peninsula News Review
  - Sooke News Mirror
  - Oak Bay News
- Victoria Buzz, Facebook community

=== AM Radio ===
- CKMO 900 kHz
- CFAX 1070 kHz

=== FM Radio ===
- CBUX, Ici Musique - 88.9
- CBCV, CBC Radio One - 90.5 MHz
- CJZN 91.3 MHz - "The Zone @ 91-3"
- CBU, CBC Music - 92.1 MHz
- CIOC 98.5 MHz - "The Ocean"
- CKKQ 100.3 MHz - "100.3 The Q!"
- CFUV 101.9 MHz - CFUV, University of Victoria
- CHTT 103.1 MHz - "Kiss FM"
- CHBE 107.3 MHz - "Virgin Radio"
- CILS 107.9 MHz - "Francophonics"

=== Television ===
- Channel 6: CHEK (Independent)
- Cable 4: SHAW (Shaw TV)
- Channel 53, Cable 12: CIVI (CTV 2)

== Regional organizations ==
- Organizations based in Victoria, British Columbia
  - AVI Health and Community Services (AVI)
  - Greater Victoria Chamber of Commerce
  - Greater Victoria Film Commission
  - Art Gallery of Greater Victoria
  - Greater Victoria Cycling Coalition
  - Greater Victoria Public Library
  - Respecting Aboriginal Values & Environmental Needs
  - Island Sexual Health
  - Peers Victoria Resources Society
  - University of Victoria Students' Society (UVSS)
  - Victoria Pride Society

== See also ==
- Fort Victoria
