= Rithet's Bog =

Peat bog in Saanich, British Columbia

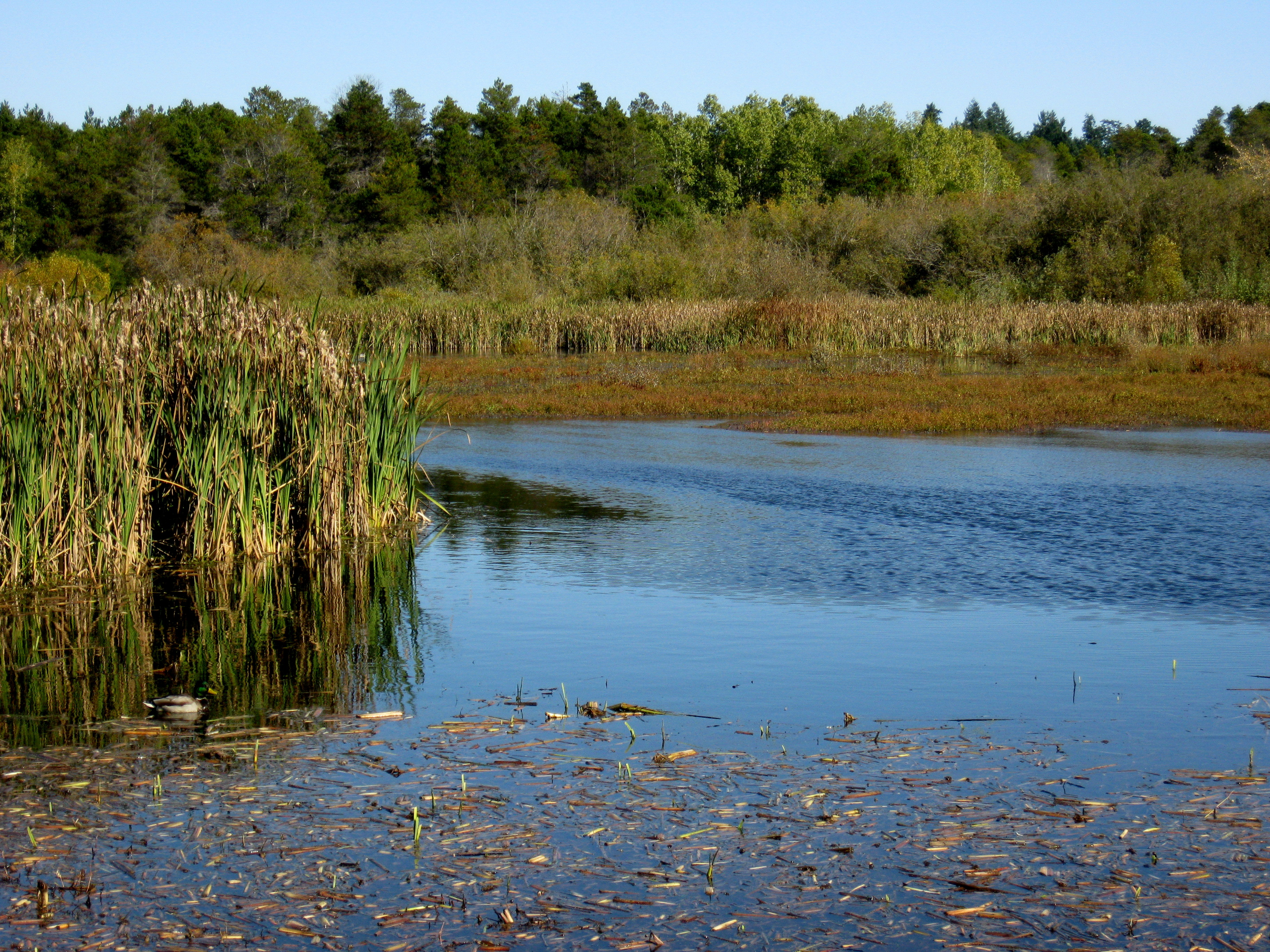

- Location within Vancouver Island Location within British Columbia
- Location: Saanich, British Columbia
- Coordinates: 48°29′27″N 123°22′51″W

Rithet's Bog is a restored lowland peat bog located in Saanich, British Columbia, Canada. The bog and its surroundings are protected as Rithet's Bog Conservation Area, a municipal park which covers an area of approximately 38 hectares (94 acres). The land was donated to the District of Saanich by the Guinness family in 1994. While the landscape was significantly altered for agricultural use beginning in the late 1800s, extensive restoration efforts have helped the bog ecosystems return.

== Ecology ==
As one of the few remaining bogs in the Greater Victoria area, with largely urbanized surroundings, Rithet's Bog provides important habitat for numerous species. Several rare plant species are found within the bog and surrounding park. A mature forest stand of shore pine and western hemlock is located in the centre.

== Recreation ==
A 3.2 km (2.0 mi) loop trail travels the perimeter of the park. The area is a popular destination for activities like walking, jogging, and birdwatching. The park does not have facilities, and no cycling or off-leash dogs are permitted on the trails.

== See also ==
- PKOLS
- Swan Lake Nature Sanctuary
