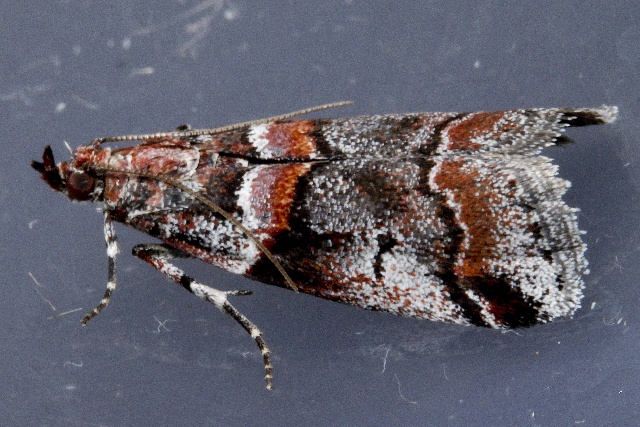

Scientific classification
- Kingdom: Animalia
- Phylum: Arthropoda
- Clade: Pancrustacea
- Class: Insecta
- Order: Lepidoptera
- Family: Pyralidae
- Genus: Acrobasis
- Species: A. tricolorella

Binomial name
- Acrobasis tricolorella Grote, 1878

Synonyms
- Mineola scitulella Hulst, 1900

= Acrobasis tricolorella =

Species of moth

Acrobasis tricolorella, the destructive prune worm or tricolored acrobasis moth, is a species of snout moth in the genus Acrobasis. It was described by Augustus Radcliffe Grote in 1878, and is known from southern Canada and northern United States.

Adults are on wing from June to October.

The larvae feed on Prunus, Malus pumila, Prunus armeniaca, Sorbus americana, Rosa, Amelanchier and Heteromeles arbutifolia. They feed on buds and fruits of their host plant. The larvae engage in leaf rolling behavior. The species overwinters in the larval stage.
