= Mount Tolmie =

Hill in the country of Canada

- Location within Vancouver Island Location within British Columbia

Highest point
- Elevation: 120 m (390 ft)
- Prominence: 120 m (390 ft)
- Coordinates: 48°27′24.44″N 123°19′32″W

Geography
- Location: British Columbia, Canada
- District: Victoria Land District
- Topo map: NTS 92B6 Victoria

Mount Tolmie, elevation 120 m (394 ft), is a hill and surrounding neighbourhood in Saanich, Greater Victoria, British Columbia. The majority of the mountain forms Mount Tolmie Park, a municipal park, while the south side has several private residences. The peak of the hill is known for its excellent views of Victoria, and the San Juan Islands. The view also includes the ability to see parts of four mountain ranges; the Olympic Mountains, the Coast Mountains, the Cascade Range (notably Mount Baker and Mount Rainier), and the Golland Range (notably Mount Work).

== Name ==
The hill is named for William Fraser Tolmie, a Scottish surgeon, fur trader, scientist, and politician employed by the Hudson's Bay Company. In 1859 Tolmie was transferred to Fort Victoria. He was later elected to the Legislative Assembly of Vancouver Island, the elected body of the Colony of Vancouver Island.

== Geology ==
Although there are volcanic peaks in the Pacific Northwest such as Mount Baker and Mount Rainier, Mount Tolmie is composed of sedimentary rocks formed in the Cretaceous period about 100 million years ago, as is its nearby larger sibling Mount Douglas.

== The neighbourhood ==
The namesake neighbourhood around the base of Mt. Tolmie is primarily residential, roughly bounded by McKenzie Avenue, Cedar Hill Road, McRae Avenue, Camosun College Lansdowne Campus, and the Henderson neighbourhood of Oak Bay Municipality.

== Features ==
The park has numerous commonly used hiking trails. Mayfair Drive goes up and over Mount Tolmie, with parking for visitors at the top, including spots for tour buses. There is a large flat-topped concrete structure with guard rails at the top that is accessible to park visitors. Some sources claim the concrete structure is a reservoir, while others claim it is the foundation of a World War II coastal defense building and VHF radio communications tower. In the 1890s, the Mountain had large white letters on the west face spelling out "MT TOLMIE PARK," and a tower with a 140-metre (460-foot) long "snowless toboggan slide."
