= Oaklands, Greater Victoria =

Neighbourhood within Victoria, Canada

The Oaklands
- Oaklands neighbourhood, Greater Victoria
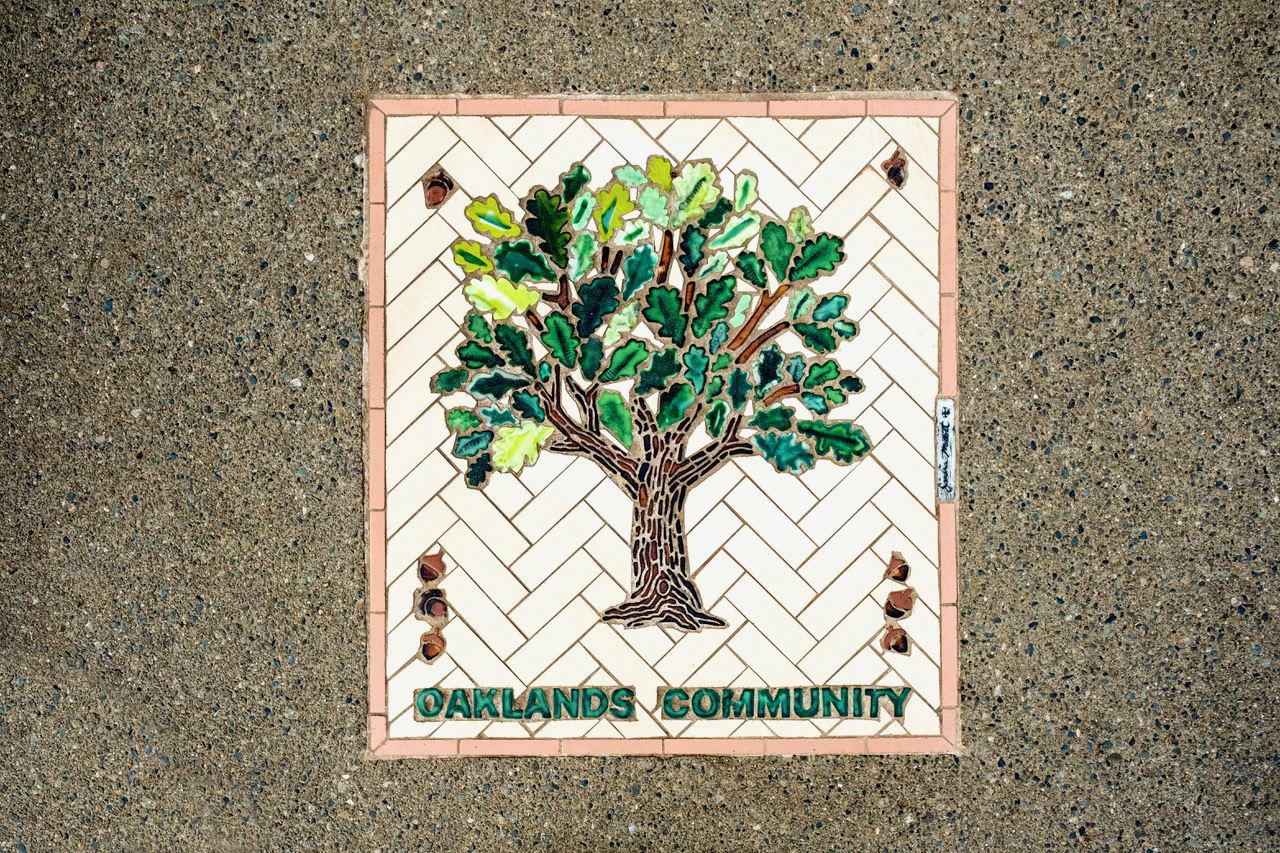
- Oakland's Community Mosaic embedded in the sidewalk at the north entrance to Oaklands Park, Victoria, British Columbia
- Country: Canada
- Province: British Columbia
- City: Victoria
- Neighbourhood: The Oaklands

Government
  - Mayor, City of Victoria: Marianne Alto
  - Neighbourhood Council liaison (2025–2026): Krista Loughton

Area
  - Urban: 173 ha (430 acres)
- Website: https://oaklands.life

The Oaklands is one of 12 neighbourhoods that make up the city of Victoria, British Columbia. From the late 1850s, large tracts of land around Fort Victoria were surveyed for farms, orchards and housing. The Oaklands over time has remained mostly a neighbourhood of single family houses. Along with many parks, sporting venues, a Woonerf, schools and easy access to shopping, universities and colleges, the Oaklands is a desirable neighbourhood for future, thoughtful residential density and commercial developments. The population of the Oaklands includes individuals from a wide array of racial, cultural, linguistic, and national backgrounds, as well as varying sexual orientations and gender identities. The Oaklands is an inclusive neighbourhood.

== Early History ==
The first known human inhabitants settled on the wast coast of North America more than 10,000 years ago. In what is now known as British Columbia or S'ólh Téméxw (meaning "our land" or "our world" in Halkomelem), the Lekwungen speaking people (the Songhees and Esquimalt First Nations) lived in the area of southern Vancouver Island for thousands of years. Before colonization and development, southern Vancouver Island was made up of woodlands and open meadows, which were used by the Songhees and Esquimalt people for food foraging, food cultivation, with many forms of land management. The Oaklands neighbourhood, as one neingbhbourhood of the city of Victoria, was carved out of the Songhees and Esquimalt peoples' traditional land as part of the colonization of British Columbia and Vancouver Island. This area remains the traditional territory of the Songhees and Esquimalt people with the right to hunt, fish and gather food on their unoccupied lands.

== Settlement ==
=== City of Victoria ===
The present-day location of the City of Victoria began in and around a natural harbour (known as the inner harbour of Victoria) with the arrival of the Maritime fur trade. The overland fur trade expanded trade between First Nations and colonizers in the Pacific North West. A Hudson Bay Company trading post was established in the inner harbour by James Douglas in 1842, followed by a fort in 1850.

The city of Victoria was incorporated in 1862 by the Legislature of Vancouver Island. Over time large tracts of land were leased to tenants and Fort Victoria began to grow. These large plots of land ultimately pushed the boundaries of new settlement into First Nations land, ultimately becoming distinct neighbourhoods of the City of Victoria.

== Neighbourhood ==
=== The Oaklands ===
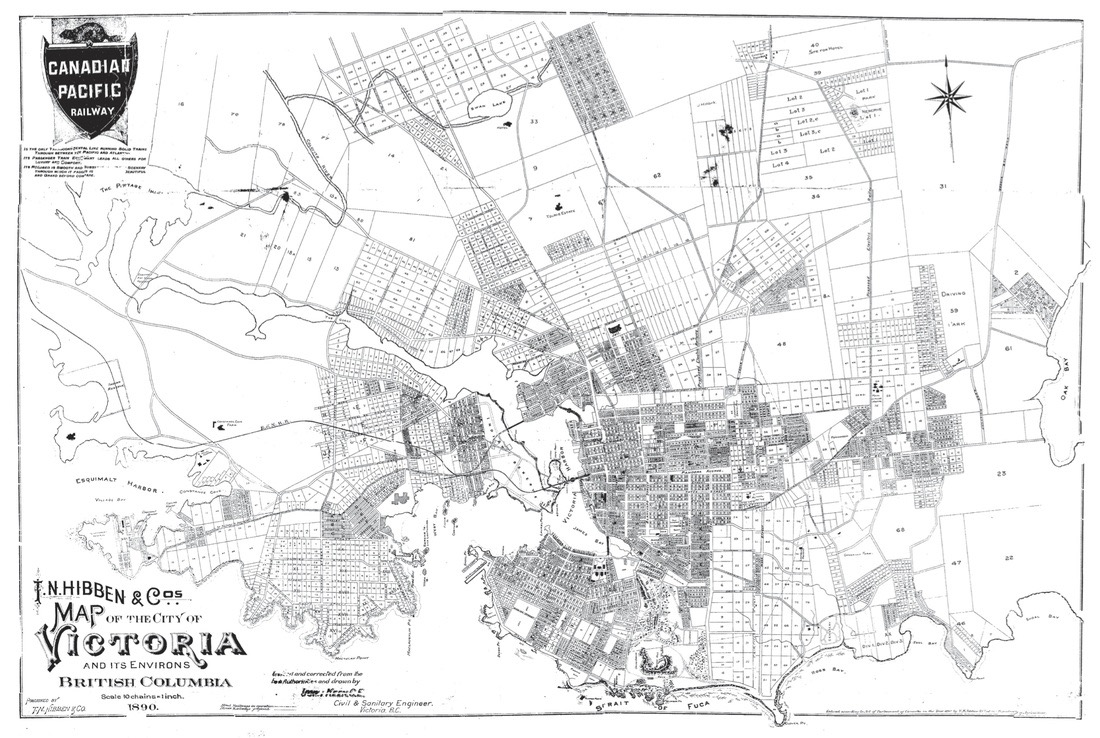
City of Victoria and its environs, 1890

The Oaklands area was surveyed in 1850 and divided into large plots in the northwestern parts of the Oaklands for farms and orchards. The Prior family [Suzette Prior, nee Work, and E.G. Prior (premier and lieutenant governor of British Columbia)] established the Hillside Farm in 1852. Further development and housing on various sized properties followed quickly as the City of Victoria expanded during the early 1910s, 1920s and 1930s. The modest housing created in the Oakland neighbourhood was advertised as being close to town centre, but still maintaining a rural feel [pre 1930].

The Oaklands is one of 12 neighbourhoods in the City of Victoria. The Oakland's neighbourhood is centrally located in relation to other City of Victoria neighbourhoods, as well as the local municipalities of Greater Victoria. The Oaklands occupies the area along the City of Victoria's northern border with the District of Saanich. Some of the other 12 neighbourhoods of Victoria border the Oaklands and include North Jubilee on the east, Fernwood to the south, and Quadra/Hillside on the west. The Oaklands neighbourhood is dissected by major North/South and East/West thoroughfares linking other neighbourhoods, districts and municipalities.

The Oaklands takes its name from the Garry oak tree Quercus garryana, which occurs throughout the Oaklands neighbourhood. The neighbourhood is predominantly single family residential housing with some low rise apartment blocks. A 2021 statistics Canada census noted that the population of the Oaklands neighbourhood is 7585.The Oaklands neighbourhood is approximately 173 hectares in area.

=== Demographics of the Oaklands neighbourhood. ===
Distribution (%) of the population by broad age groups	
0 to 14 years	13
15 to 64 years	67
65 years and over	20
85 years and over	5
Average age of the population	43
Occupied private dwellings by structural type of dwelling	3,310
Single-detached house	990
Semi-detached house	150
Row house	345
Apartment or flat in a duplex	630
Apartment in a building that has fewer than five storeys	1,185
Apartment in a building that has five or more storeys	0
Other single-attached house	5
Movable dwelling	0
Private households by household size	3,305
1 person	1,175
2 persons	1,120
3 persons	485
4 persons	355
5 or more persons	170
Average household size	2
Number of persons in private households	7,225

== Attractions ==
=== Architecture ===
Since the Oaklands neighbourhood was established in the late 1890s, and through many years of house building, the neighbourhood has very fine examples of homes such as vernacular Edwardian architecture(1901–1910), Arts & Crafts houses (1904–1920) and Craftsman Bungalows (1900–1930). The Victoria Heritage Foundation operates a registry of 20th-century architectural house styles, and they have identified the Oaklands Rise area in the northwest corner of the Oaklands as an area of interest for house architectural types. More modern homes are scattered throughout the Oaklands as aging homes are replaced with housing styles contemporary to these times (1940–2020s).

=== Art ===
Oaklands Outdoor Art (OOA) is a local initiative that conducted an inventory of outdoor art. This outdoor art reflects the local cultures, social events and environment of the Oaklands Neighbourhood. Art pieces include street paintings and sidewalk art, murals, mosaics, small architectural follies, and wooden benches.

The Fernwood Art Stroll is a non-juried art event that was formed in 2007 by artists and artisans in the Fernwood neighbourhood, and who invite the public into their studios and to view their work. The Art Stroll has expanded to include numerous artists in the Oaklands neighbourhood.

=== Cemetery ===
The Bays Ha Chayim Jewish Cemetery, consecrated in 1859, is the oldest continuous operating non-indigenous cemetery in British Columbia.

=== Parks ===
The Oaklands neighbourhood has nine parks/green spaces of varying size and function: Clawthorpe Park children's playground and David Spencer Park, (playing field and open space), which is named for David Spencer a business man who lived in Victoria with his family from 1864 until his death in 1920. There are also Highview Playlot, Hillside Park, Kiwanis Green and Mt. Stephens Park, which is a protected Garry oak area. Oaklands Holly Green is a protected green space and Oswald park has the Oswald Community Garden; an allotment garden, which is one of the many gardens of the City of Victoria's Community Garden initiative. Oswald Park also has a playground, basketball court, and an off-leash dog area. Oaklands Park features a children's playground, large playing fields, public washrooms, an off-leash dog area, and tennis and pickle ball courts. Ryan Road Green Space: The Ryan Street Greenways Project and the related Garry oak Restoration project led by students, focused on invasive plant removal, native plant additions, and slope stabilization within a city-owned site on Ryan Street.

Oaklands greenway loop is a self-guided and easy walk through the Oaklands neighbourhood via some the above mentioned parks and green spaces.

=== Pedestrian priority walkway ===
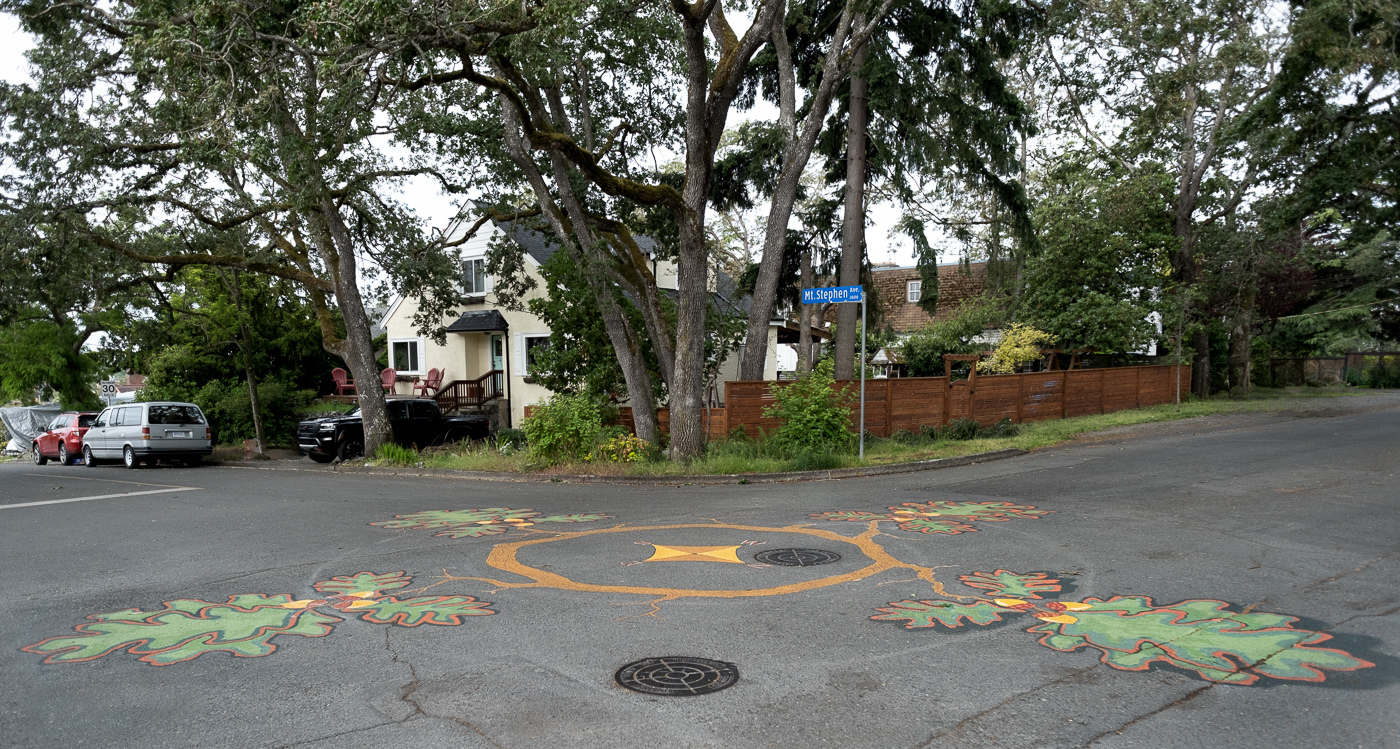
Oaklands Rise Woonerf. An intersection painting in the Oaklands Rise Walkway surrounded by the Oaklands namesake Garry Oak trees. Photograph by Dale Horricks.

The Oakland Rise Walkway is patterned on a Dutch Woonerf, a pedestrian priority and living street. The principle of the Oaklands Rise Walkway is that of a shared space - such that this space is shared with all ages and mobilities, and with slow moving bicycles, scooters and vehicles. The Oakland Rise Walkway, with one end near the Oaklands Rise area of Kings Street runs through to Oaklands Park on its eastern end. The Oaklands Rise Walkway is decorated with painted intersections, painted planters and furnished with wooden benches, and enhanced with parklets.

=== Sport venues ===
The Mount Stephen Athletic Club in the Oaklands supported a boxing venue on a property in the 2600 block of Mount Stephen Avenue between 1934 and 1936. Currently, baseball is played at the Jerry Hale Field at the corner of Cook Street and Hillside Avenue. Baseball teams based in the Oaklands have been associated with the National Little League since 1953. The National Little League is the longest running Little League on Vancouver Island and it is a chartered member of the Little League International. Additional baseball diamonds are at David Spencer park and Oaklands Park. There are tennis and Pickleball courts at the south end of Oaklands Park, along with basket ball hoops and a road hockey area. Oaklands Park also has a seasonal soccer pitch.

=== Urban forest ===
The Oaklands's namesake, the Garry oak tree, predominates as one of the principal trees of boulevards, parks and residential properties in the Oaklands neighbourhood. The Garry oak is uniquely adapted to the maritime climate found in the rain shadow of the southern end of Vancouver Island. In its natural habitat the Garry oak tree predominates in an ecosystem of woodlands to meadows, a habitat that was a large part of the Oaklands. As urban developments occur, fewer open meadows and wooded natural areas of Garry oak remain. This decline in Garry oak has allowed coniferous trees to grow up and shade out Garry oak trees, and too, landowners and municipal governments prefer to plant faster-growing trees (often exotic trees) whose roots do not pose a threat to underground infrastructure. As a consequence of these changes the Garry oak tree in the Oaklands neighbourhood is limited to small artificial refugia of urban parks and boulevards, and private and city lots. The restoration of the Garry oak and the preservation of its natural habitat are major initiatives of the Garry oak Meadow preservation society in the Oaklands neighbourhood.

Over the years and because of Victoria's favourable climate for tree growth, many native trees, but more non-native trees have been planted on city properties as well as on private properties. But, the current tree planting efforts by the City of Victoria has been recognized and awarded the honorific of a "tree city of the world", for 4 years running( 2020 to 2024). The total percentage of tree cover for the city of Victoria is 27%, whereas a slightly higher percentage of tree cover (28%) is found in the Oaklands neighbourhood.

Some unusual trees have been planted on city property in the Oaklands, including a living fossil, the Ginkgo tree (Ginkgo biloba), with many specimen planted along most of the length of Belmont Avenue between Ryan Street and Haultain Street. Another living fossil, the dawn redwood (Metasequoia glyptostroboides) is represented by two examples in the Oaklands neighbourhood; one on Pearl Street between Shakespeare Street and Scott Street, and the second on the northeast corner of Oswald Park.

=== Water courses ===
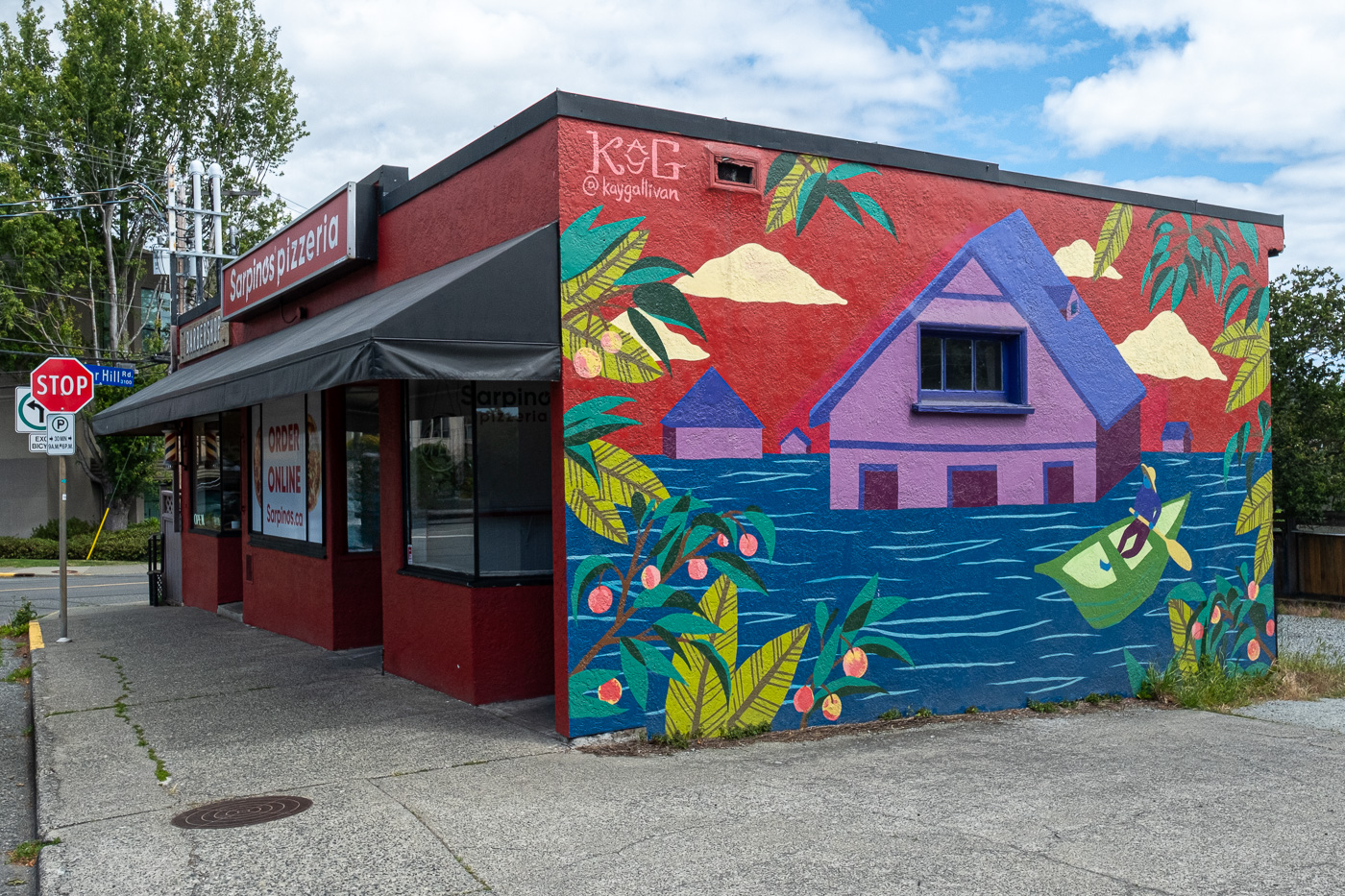
Wall mural The Flood depicting the 1935 flood of Haultian Avenue, in the Oakland neighbourhood, Victoria, British Columbia. Artist Kay Gallivan. Photograph by Dale Horricks.

Two seasonal creeks are influenced by the Oaklands neighbourhood. The major one, Bowker Creek, flows year-round with a flow rate increasing with winter rains (November to March). Bowker Creek is above ground with two starting points in the municipality of Sannich. The Bowker Creek watershed drains the north east corner of the Oaklands, but through the Oaklands Bowker Creek is completely culverted. The culverted section has attracted some 'Draining Adventurers'. Bowker Creek is again above ground through the neighbourhood of North Jubilee and the district the Oak Bay before exiting into the ocean at the Oak Bay. The 'Friends of Bowker Creek' are committed to daylighting the full length of the creek, as well as, instituting other ecological restorations. A second minor seasonal water course is the Rock Bay Creek. Although the creek did not directly flow through the Oaklands, the watershed for the creek drained parts of the south western side of the Oaklands. The Rock Bay Creek was culverted during the early years of urban development (1900s) to allow for land development, but also to control the creek's flow. Damaging floods in the past (1935) along Haultain Street was a reason that flow controls were instituted. The 'Rock Bay Revival' is intent on daylighting the full length of Rock Bay Creek.

== Community Association, Societies and Schools ==
=== Community Association ===
The Oaklands Community Association is housed in the Oaklands School building. The Community Association offers day care, afterschool care and a variety of programs and events throughout the year.

=== Housing societies ===
The M'akola Housing Society provides housing primarily for indigenous people and families. The Kiwanis club operates the Kiwanis Village – seniors housing in the Oaklands. There are also several housing cooperatives (Co-ops) in Oaklands: The Alf Toone Housing Co-op on Mt. Stephen Road, and Heatheridge Housing Co-op and Oakwinds Co-op on Hillside Avenue. The Piercy Respite Hotel is a respite service that provides individuals and their caregivers with a period of rest and renewal.

=== Public and not for profit Institutions ===
The BC Protestant Orphanage was built in 1893 from the funds of a bequest, and it functioned as a 100 bed orphanage. In 1970 the orphanage became an organization offering support for families and was renamed 'The Cridge Centre for the Family' after its founding member, Bishop Edward Cridge. The Duke and Duchess of Cambridge visited the Cridge Centre on October 1, 2016, to dedicate a statue to 'overcomers' of domestic violence. In addition, the Aberdeen Hospital, run by Island Health, is a long-term care hospital for adults with complex neurological challenges.

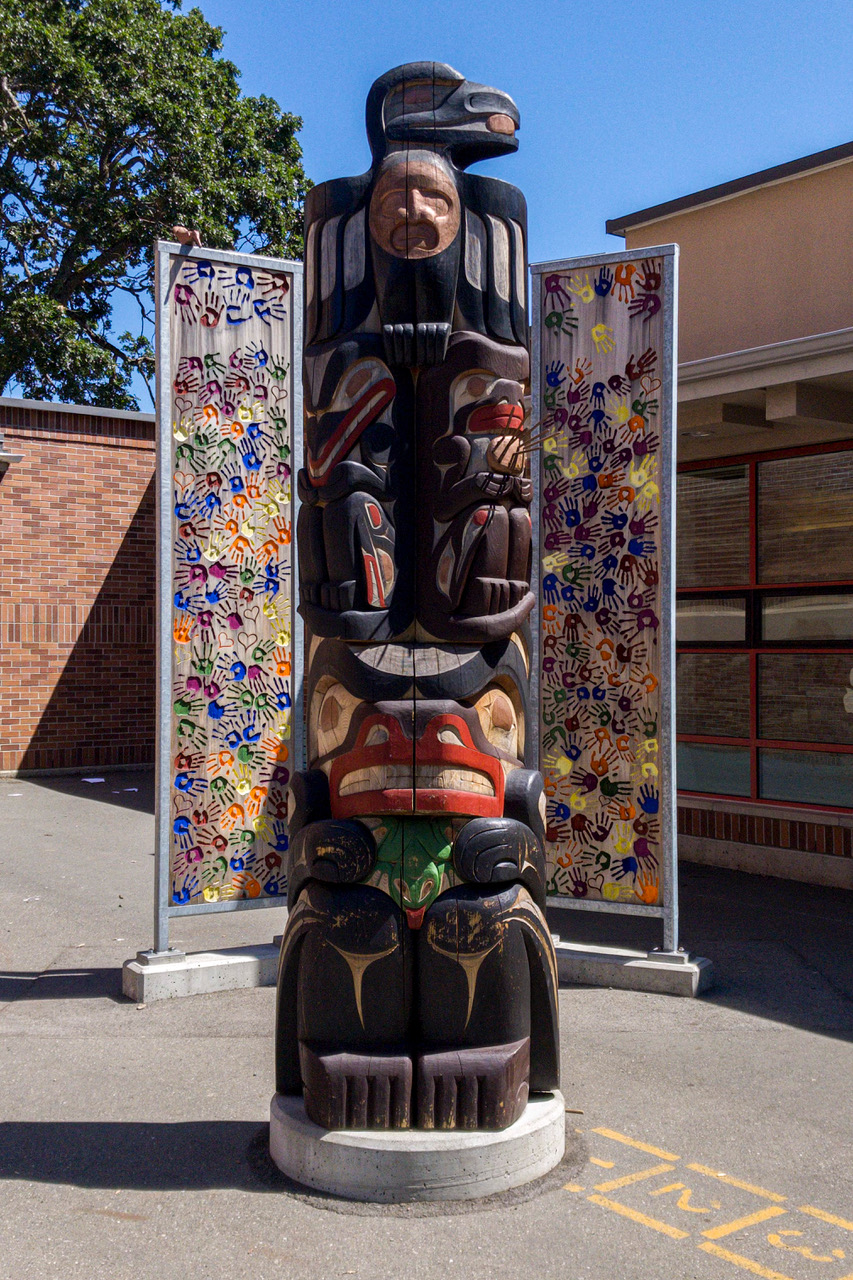
Totem pole inspired by the students at Oaklands Elementary School, Victoria, British Columbia. Artist Carey Newman. Unveiled in 2021. Photograph by Dale Horricks.

=== Schools ===
The Oaklands Elementary School located on Belmont Avenue, was built in 1913 and designed by local architect Charles Elwood Watkins, with an annex added in 1926, designed by Percy Fox. The original brick building is carefully preserved after structural and energy efficiency upgrades (2024-2026) and it continues to serve the families in the Oaklands. The school offers programs for Kindergarten to grade 5 for approximately 450 students.

The Victoria School for Ideal Education is also located on Belmont Avenue. The private school fosters students from kindergarten to grade 8 through a nurturing and rigorous learning environment.

Oak and Orca Bioregional school a private school on Higgins Street uses holistic learning experiences for grades kindergarten to grade 12 with in-class instruction or home learning packages or blended programs.

== Services ==
=== Local shopping areas ===
Small independent stores and services are found throughout the Oaklands. There is small concentration of stores in the 1100 and 1400 block of Haultain Avenue. At the eastern edge of the Oaklands near the corner of Kings Road and Shelbourne Street is one of Vancouver Island's finest leather goods and leather shoemakers - BAO shoemaker. Another small concentration of stores are along Cedar Hill Road and part of Hillside Avenue. A major shopping area along Hillside Avenue is anchored by the Hillside Shopping Centre in the north east corner of the Oaklands, bounded by Hillside Avenue and North Dairy Road between Doncaster Drive and Shelbourne Street.

== Notable elements ==
=== Residents ===
Carey Newman, an indigenous artist, lives in the Oaklands neighbourhood. Among the many art pieces created by Carey is his well known Witness Blanket that reflects on Canada's residential schools.

=== Streets ===
Trees of Remembrance: approximately 6 blocks of the Shelbourne Street Memorial Trees is in the Oaklands, from North Dairy Road south to Haultain Street. Tree planting began in 1921 with a mixture of London plane trees and American mountain ash (Sorbus americana). The trees were planted to honour and memorialize the war dead - fallen soldiers and nurses of British Columbia - in the First World War and the Boer War. The trees now represent loss in all of Canada's wars.

Notable streets in the Oaklands, i.e., Asquith Street named after the United Kingdom Prime Minister H. H. Asquith, Avebury Street named after Baron Avebury, Haultain Street, named after Fredrick Haultain a Canadian politician and Roseberry Avenue named after the Earl of Roseberry.
