= Hartland landfill =

Waste disposal site in British Columbia, Canada

Coordinates: 48.538148°N 123.463368°W

The Hartland landfill is the waste disposal site for the city of Victoria, British Columbia and the Greater Victoria area. The landfill began operating in the early 1950's under private ownership and management. Phase 1 of the landfill reached capacity in 1996, Phase 2 filled in Heal Lake which was drained and was 2.5-hectares. The landfill was later purchased by the Capital Regional District in 1975 and has been directly operated by its Environmental Sustainability Department since 1985. The landfill, located in the District of Saanich on the southern slope of Mount Work, between Victoria and Sidney, at the end of Hartland Avenue is adjacent to Mount Work Regional Park to the west and the Department of National Defence rifle range is located across Willis Point Road to the northeast. To the east and southeast of the site are residential properties. Undeveloped CRD property (about 198 hectares in total) lies to the west and south of the landfill site and is now being used by CRD Parks as a mountain bike recreation area under a land use agreement (memorandum of understanding). Private residential properties exist to the east and southeast of the landfill.

There is a public waste drop-off area, a recycling centre, a household hazardous waste collection facility and an electricity generating station that utilizes a small amount of methane gas as a fuel source under contract with FortisBC. It is an "award-winning facility." In order to allow for the continual dumping of waste by expanding the existing life of the landfill to 2100, the CRD’s draft Solid Waste Management Plan (SWMP) in November 2020 called for the expansion of the Hartland landfill and the removal of 73 acres of trees. The 2021 SWMP, approved in June 2023, proposed waste reduction measures, while maintaining the possibility of developing further landfill. As of November 2025, "it is estimated that Hartland’s current capacity will be reached in approximately 2050."

== Cycling, hiking, tours and sights ==
There are varying levels of mountain biking trails for people who wish to use ATB, All Terrain Bikes. These paths are located outside the fenced garbage disposal and processing areas. The cycling, or hiking areas have park signs and water hose stations to clean cycling equipment. The mountain bike and hiking trails are in the land areas within the Mount Work Regional Park boundaries.

Abundant birds in the Hartland area include raven, bald eagle and several species of hawk. The area is a sensitive ecosystem home to 16 species at risk including the Western Screech-owl and Painted Turtle. The CRD's current plan to remove 73 acres of Douglas fir forest and sensitive eco-systems in the Mount Work area is unacceptable to many living in the community. This particular forest stores 180 tonnes of carbon a year - an offset equivalent to taking 195 cars off the road every year. Over the 50 year extension of the proposed Hartland landfill, carbon emissions would be increased by 9000 tonnes. This amount is inconsistent with the CRD's overall goal of making the region carbon neutral by 2050. Alternatives to outdated 19th century landfilling exist and are used in many countries around the world.

The CRD conducts public tours of the Hartland landfill facility, on the subject of waste management, recycling, and capture of waste gas as a supplementary source of electricity generation.

== History ==
The Hartland landfill started as a private dump site in the early 1950s. The Hartland landfill was bought by the Capital Regional District in 1975, and was managed privately until 1985, when the CRD assumed direct control. This original part of the landfill, dubbed Phase 1, reached capacity in 1996, and was completely closed by 1998, capped in plastic and soil. The 1991 SWMP had already scheduled Phase 2 to begin landfilling by 1993; it did not begin operation until April 30, 1997. This involved blasting out the side of a rock face and covering phase one with dirt and vegetation. This procedure is still taking place. In 2003 the Hartland landfill installed an electricity generating station, to create electricity from the methane gas that was being collected from the decomposing refuse. This generating station now creates 1.6 megawatts of electricity, enough to power about 1,600 homes. After analysis of its garbage composition, the landfill found that 30 percent of its garbage was organic in nature. This has resulted in calls for local food waste collection and composting, which is currently done in some of the region's municipalities either as a regular service or as a pilot project.

== Procedures and policies ==
The Hartland landfill is a sanitary landfill, which means that it has a comprehensive system of environmental controls and monitoring programs to mitigate its effects on the environment. Landfill gas created by the decomposition is collected by gas wells and is used for generating electricity. Leachate is collected in two lagoons and it is disposed of through the sanitary sewer system.

The landfill has had challenges with the introduction of the non-native species of plants and animals, including the European wall lizard. The Hartland landfill operating bylaw prohibits scavenging of any kind. This is due to safety liability. The Hartland landfill gives free public tours.
