= Happy Valley, British Columbia =

Happy Valley
- Location of Happy Valley in British Columbia
- Coordinates: 48°25′00″N 123°32′00″W
- Country: Canada
- Province: British Columbia
- Time zone: UTC−07:00 (Pacific Time)
- Area codes: 250, 778

Happy Valley is an unincorporated settlement in the Western Communities area of Greater Victoria on southern Vancouver Island in British Columbia, Canada. Happy Valley, which is located south of Glen Lake and west of Triangular Hill, had its own post office from 1896 to 1922.

Happy Valley, BC is not an official municipality - it is a part of the municipalities of Langford and Metchosin, BC. There is no mayor for this specific area.

== Local attractions ==
=== Glen Lake ===
Glen Lake has a boardwalk on the southern shore with fishing opportunities and a small swimming beach at Glen Cove on the Galloping Goose Regional Trail. Glen Lake Beach Park at the north end provides a children’s playground and Spray Park, swimming beach, and accessible picnic tables tucked underneath giant willow and Douglas fir trees. There is an exercise area, boat launch and swimming beach that are all dog friendly year round.

=== Galloping Goose Trail ===
The Galloping Goose Trail connects cyclists and hikers from throughout the Capital Region to the City of Langford. The Trail runs through south-central Langford and along the southern tip of Glen Lake. It is the main bicycle and pedestrian artery within the Capital Region. The Galloping Goose is a good choice for commuters to and from Langford. The Galloping Goose is southern Vancouver Island's most travelled trail and provides a continuous route from Sooke to Sidney to downtown Victoria. The Trail moves through urban, rural and wilderness settings and the surface of the trail often reflects its surroundings. The majority of the Trail is unpaved gravel while the downtown portions that pass through View Royal, Saanich, and Victoria are paved.

=== Goldstream Farmer’s Market ===
Farmers from Happy Valley go to this event to sell their harvests and wares.

The Goldstream Farmers Market is held Saturdays during the summer months, in the heart of Langford's city Centre, at Veterans Memorial Park.

== History ==
The settlement began c.1860 when blacks who came to BC from the United States settled there. One account of the name says it was their singing which inspired the name, another says it was one of them, Isaac Mull, who conferred it because of his happiness at becoming a free man under British rule.
