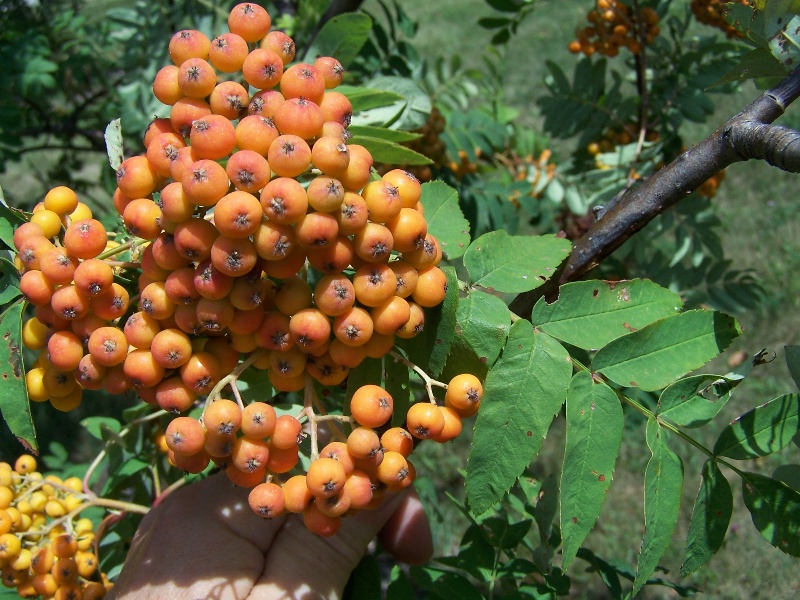

Conservation status
- Least Concern (IUCN 3.1)

Scientific classification
- Kingdom: Plantae
- Clade: Tracheophytes
- Clade: Angiosperms
- Clade: Eudicots
- Clade: Rosids
- Order: Rosales
- Family: Rosaceae
- Genus: Sorbus
- Section: Sorbus sect. Commixtae
- Species: S. americana

Binomial name
- Sorbus americana Marshall
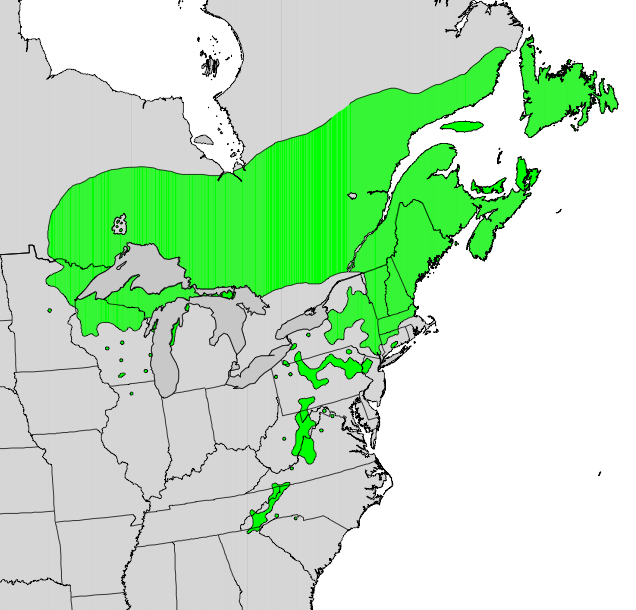
- Distribution map of native Sorbus americana range.

Synonyms
- Aucuparia americana (Marshall) Nieuwl.; Pyrus americana (Marshall) DC.; Pyrus americana (Marshall) Spreng.

= Sorbus americana =

American mountain-ash

Species of tree

The tree species Sorbus americana is commonly known as the American mountain-ash. It is a deciduous perennial tree, native to eastern North America.

The American mountain-ash and related species (most often the European mountain-ash, Sorbus aucuparia) are also referred to as rowan trees.

== Description ==
Sorbus americana is a relatively small tree, reaching 12 metres (40 ft) in height. The American mountain-ash attains its largest specimens on the northern shores of Lake Huron and Lake Superior.

It resembles the European mountain-ash, Sorbus aucuparia.

Bark
Light gray, smooth, surface scaly. Branchlets downy at first, later become smooth, brown tinged with red, lenticular, finally they become darker and the papery outer layer becomes easily separable.
Wood
Pale brown; light, soft, close-grained but weak. Specific gravity, 0.5451; weight of cu. ft., 33.97 lbs.
Winter buds
Dark red, acute, one-fourth to three-quarters of an inch long. Inner scales are very tomentose and enlarge with the growing shoot.
Leaves
Alternate, compound, odd-pinnate, 6 to 10 inches (15 to 25 cm) long, with slender, grooved, dark green or red petiole. Leaflets 13 to 17, lanceolate or long oval, two to three inches long, one-half to two-thirds broad, unequally wedge-shaped or rounded at base, serrate, acuminate, sessile, the terminal one sometimes borne on a stalk half an inch long, feather-veined, midrib prominent beneath, grooved above. They come out of the bud downy, conduplicate; when full grown are smooth, dark yellow green above and paler beneath. In autumn they turn a clear yellow. Stipules leaf-like, caducous.
Flowers
May, June, after the leaves are full grown. Perfect, white, one-eighth of an inch across, borne in flat compound cymes three or four inches across. Bracts and bractlets acute, minute, caducous.
Calyx
Urn-shaped, hairy, five-lobed; lobes, short, acute, imbricate in bud.
Corolla
Petals five, creamy white, orbicular, contracted into short claws, inserted on calyx, imbricate in bud.
Stamens
Twenty to thirty, inserted on calyx tube; filaments thread-like; anthers introrse, two-celled; cells opening longitudinally.
Pistil
Two to three carpels inserted in the bottom of the calyx tube and united into an inferior ovary. Styles two to three; stigmas capitate; ovules two in each cell.
Fruit
Berry-like pome, globular, one-quarter of an inch across, bright red, borne in cymous clusters. Ripens in October and remains on the tree all winter. Flesh thin and sour, charged with malic acid; seeds light brown, oblong, compressed; cotyledons fleshy.

== Distribution ==
Native to eastern North America;

- Eastern Canada – New Brunswick, Newfoundland, Nova Scotia, Ontario, Prince Edward Island, Quebec
- Northeastern United States – Connecticut, Maine, Massachusetts, New Hampshire, New Jersey, New York, Pennsylvania, Vermont
- North-Central United States – Illinois [n. (Ogle Co.)], Michigan, Minnesota, Wisconsin. Listed as endangered by the State of Illinois
- Southeastern United States – Appalachian Mountains, Georgia, Maryland, North Carolina, Tennessee, Virginia, West Virginia

== Biota ==
The berries of American mountain-ash are eaten by numerous species of birds, including ruffed grouse, ptarmigans, sharp-tailed grouse, blue grouse, American robins, other thrushes, waxwings, jays, and small mammals, such as squirrels and rodents.

American mountain-ash is a preferred browse for moose and white-tailed deer. Moose will eat foliage, twigs, and bark. Up to 80 percent of American mountain-ash stems were browsed by moose in control plots adjacent to exclosures on Isle Royale. Fishers, martens, snowshoe hares, and ruffed grouse also browse American mountain-ash.

== Cultivation ==
Sorbus americana is cultivated as an ornamental tree, for use in gardens and parks. It prefers a rich moist soil and the borders of swamps, but will flourish on rocky hillsides.

A cultivar is the red cascade mountain-ash, or Sorbus americana 'Dwarfcrown'. It is planted in gardens, and as a street tree.

== Uses ==
After their first winter freeze, the fruits are edible raw or cooked. They can be used to make pie and jelly.
