= Swan Lake Nature Sanctuary =

Nature reserve in British Columbia

Coordinates: 48.4636°N 123.373°W

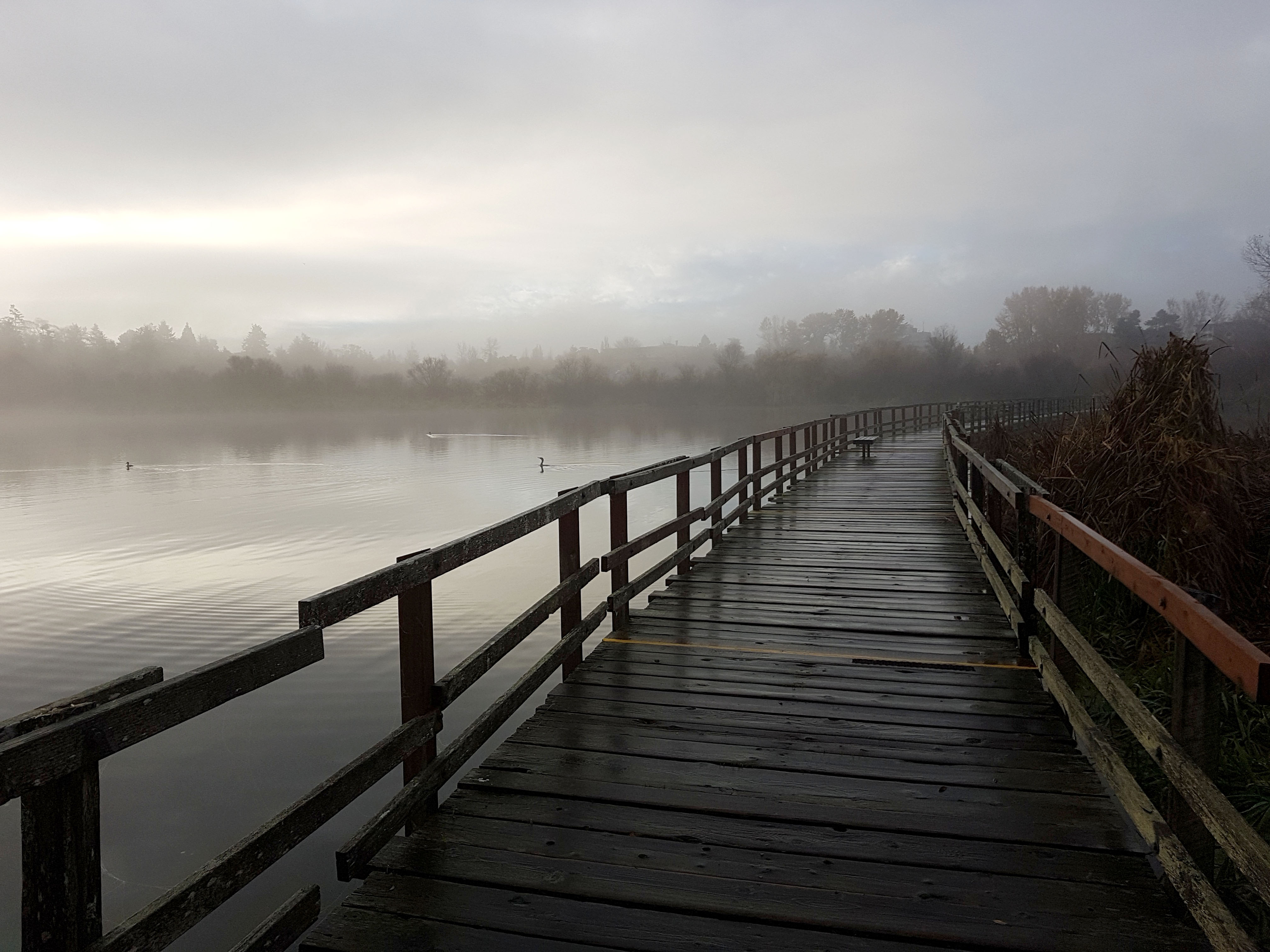
Swan Lake boardwalk

Swan Lake Christmas Hill Nature Sanctuary is a nature reserve located in Saanich, British Columbia. The sanctuary includes a lake, adjacent marshy lowlands, and the Nature House, as well as a good part of the summit regions of Christmas Hill.

The nature sanctuary consists of two physically and ecologically distinct areas: the low wetland area surrounding Swan Lake, and the rocky Garry oak-forested hilltop of Christmas Hill. The two areas are joined by a connecting corridor trail along the Nelthorpe Road allowance, crossing McKenzie Avenue at a pedestrian-controlled crosswalk. Portions of the corridor trail are on the roadside, and are identified by signs with a hiker symbol and arrow to indicate the direction.

The sanctuary land surrounding the lake covers 43.4 hectares (107 acres) in addition to the 9.4-hectare (23-acre) lake. In the winter flooding stage, the lake can cover up to 32.4 hectares (80 acres) of the low-lying lands around the lake.

== Sanctuary grounds ==
All of the nature sanctuary lands are owned by Saanich, except for the two parcels identified on the map (Swan lake map, below) as Nature Trust BC Lands, covering 2.4 hectares (5.9 acres). All of the lands are managed by the Swan Lake Christmas Hill Nature Sanctuary Society under the terms of a land management agreement between the society and the Municipality of Saanich.

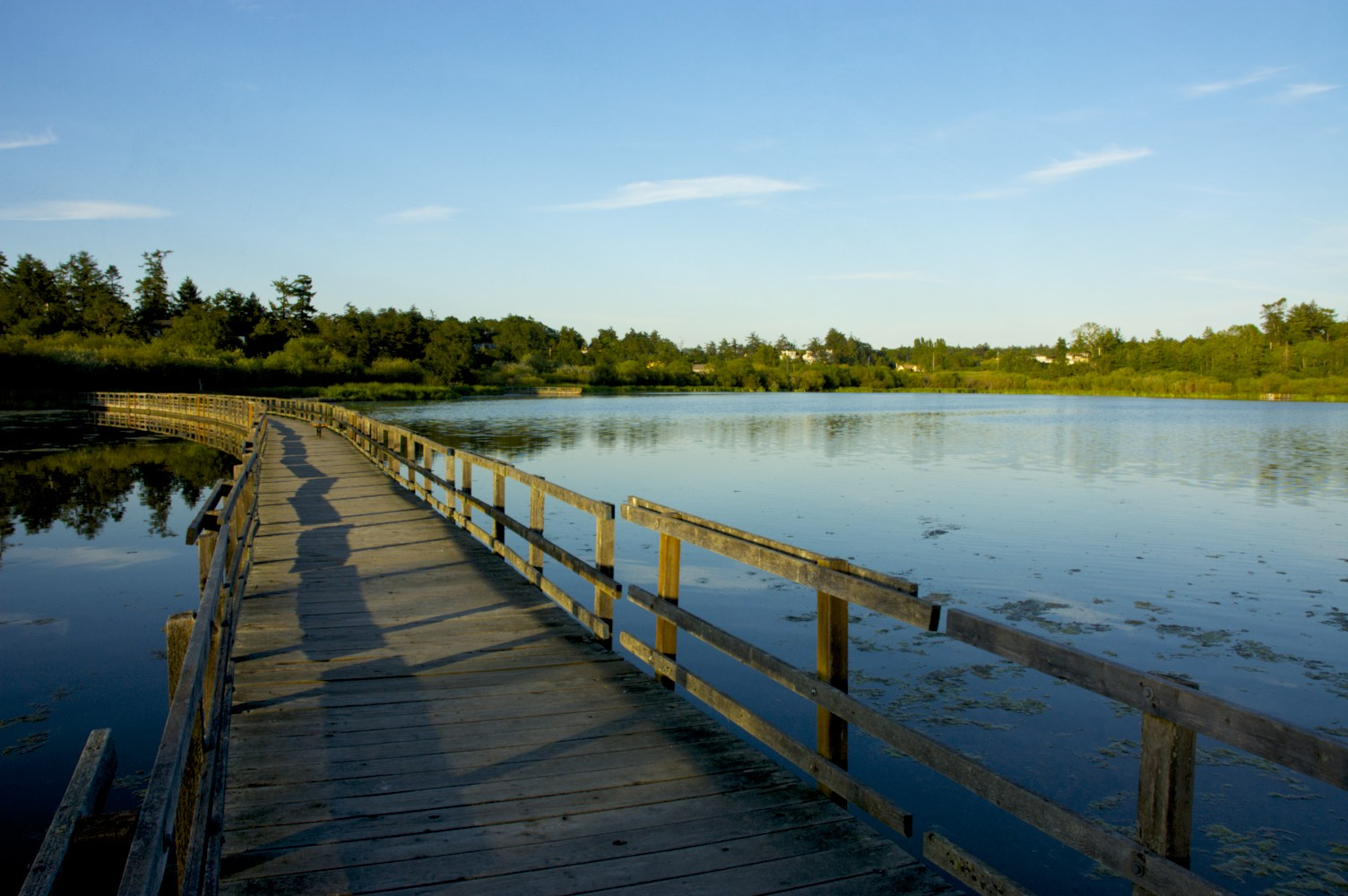
The boardwalk across Swan Lake

- Lake surface area: 9.4 hectares (23 acres)
- Winter flood lake area: 32.4 hectares (80 acres)
- Land area excluding lake: 43.4 hectares (107 acres)
- Land area including lake: 53 hectares (130 acres)

The Swan Lake portion of the nature sanctuary is bordered on the west by the Pat Bay Highway; on the east by Saanich Road; on the north by Ralph Street, Sevenoaks and Nelthorpe; and on the south by the Lockside Regional Trail. On the east side of Saanich Road, the vegetated area under the Lochside trestle is also part of the sanctuary lands. Blenkinsop Creek flows through this area on its way to Swan Lake.

The Christmas Hill portion of the nature sanctuary is bordered on the west by a community greenway trail linking Rainbow Street with Rogers Avenue and Rogers Elementary School, and on the south, east and north by mixed residential lands.

== History ==
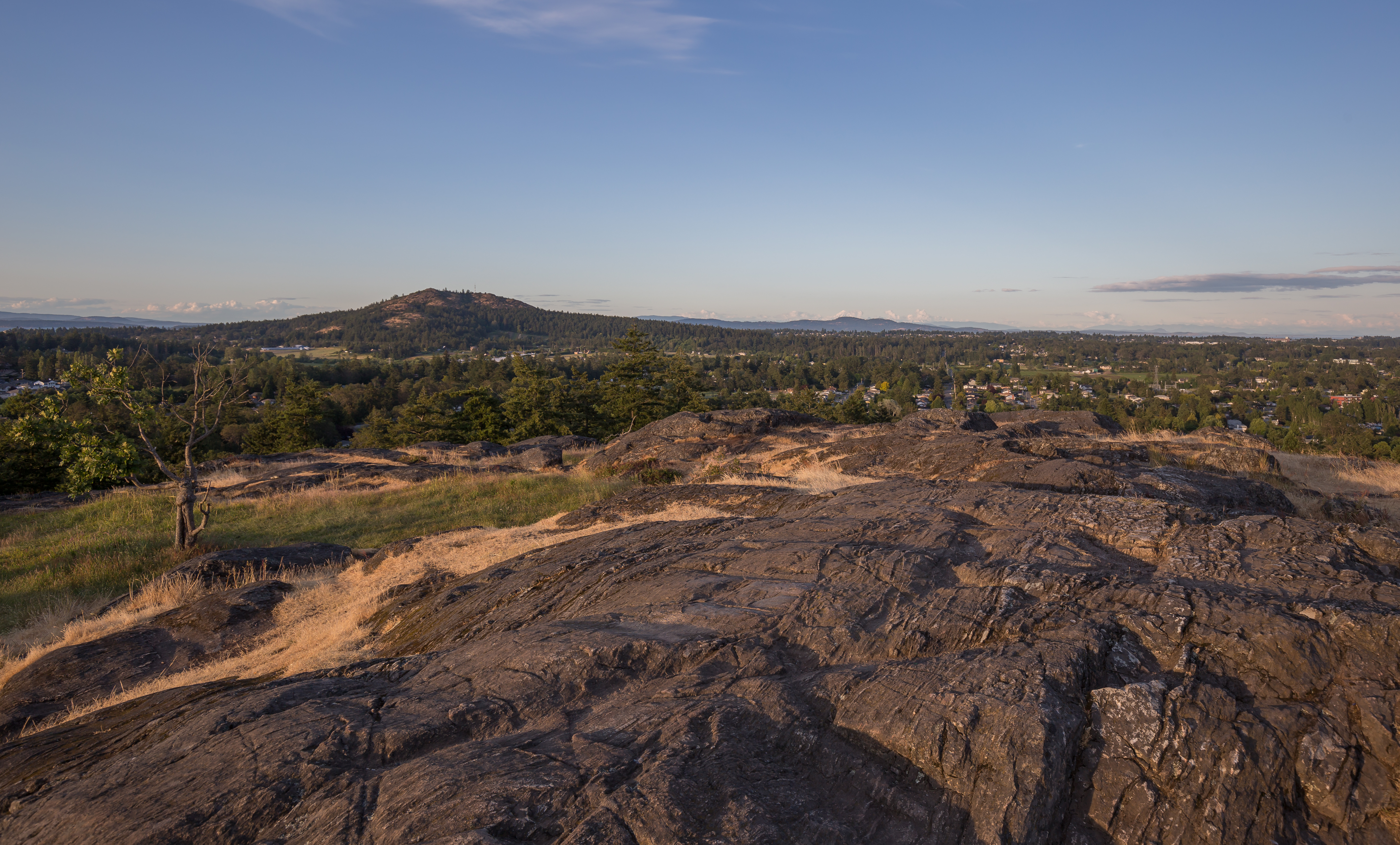
View from Christmas Hill

=== Pre-contact human history ===
First Nations people have lived in coastal B.C. areas for at least 8–9,000 years, though the oldest documented archaeological sites in the Victoria area are about 4,150 years old.

Grant Keddie, Royal BC Museum archaeologist, describes Swan Lake as an important hunting and gathering area for the Songhees people. Over the years, a number of arrowheads and spear tips have been found in the fields and hillsides surrounding the lake, indicating a high level of hunting in the region.

Over a hundred species of plants were known and used by the Songhees for food, medicines and for numerous items used in food gathering and preparation, shelter and ceremony. Important food plants include the Camas lily, wild onion, western crab apple, chocolate lily bulbs, Oregon grape, salmonberry, elderberry, Pacific blackberry, red huckleberry, thimbleberry and fern rhizomes. A variety of cat-tails and swamp rushes were harvested from the lake shore and used in weaving shelters, mats, baskets and clothing.

The lake and streams would have provided a variety of fish, including salmon, rainbow trout, steelhead trout and perch, caught by trolling, jigging, spearing and the placement of wooden basket traps.

All varieties of large birds were hunted and their eggs collected, especially in the winter and during the spring migrations when bird populations soared. Remains of food found in ancient villages show that species of ducks and seagulls represent a large number of the birds consumed. Scoters, grebes, geese, swans, sandhill craness, loons and cormorants, grouse, pigeons, and predator birds such as eagles and hawks were consumed.

Pole nets would have been used extensively at Swan Lake to catch waterfowl. A net stretched between two tall poles would be suddenly raised into the flight path of ducks as they swooped towards the lake in the evening.

Bird parts were used for many things, often related to spiritual or ceremonial use. Women plucked waterfowl and mixed the down with twisted pieces of goose skin and stinging nettle fiber twine to make a textile used for shirts and robes. Bird down was stored in a bag made of swan skin. Feathers were used on masks, headdresses, clothing, and many small ritual objects. Bird skulls, beaks and wings were carried as charms associated with special spirit powers.

Deer would have been plentiful around the lake area, providing an important source of food. Clothing was made from deer hides, and a variety of tools were made from the antlers, including wedges, tool shafts, harpoon, spear and arrow points, awls, chisels, needles, blanket pins, combs, scrapers and fish hook barbs.

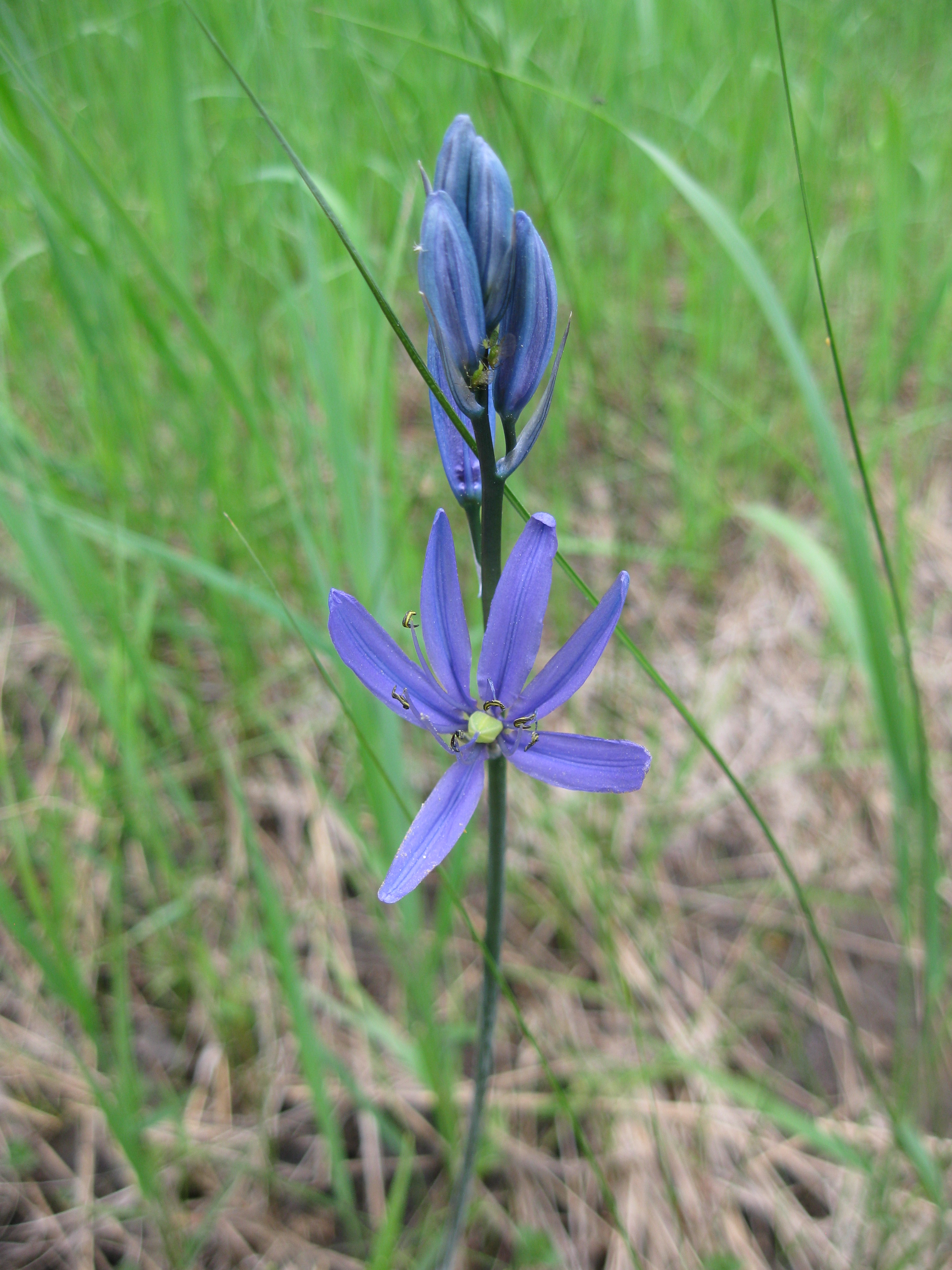
Camas lily in bloom

The rocky Garry Oak-forested slopes of Christmas hill would likely have been used by the Songhees for the cultivation of the Camas bulb, an important part of the First Nations people's diet. They practiced a wide variety of cultivation techniques, including prescribed burning, to preserve the open landscape favored by the Camas lily. It is thought that the predominance and persistence of Garry oak ecosystems across much of Greater Victoria prior to European settlement was a direct result of centuries of burning and harvesting Camas bulbs.

=== European settlers ===
==== Purchase of land from First Nations ====
The Songhees people included a tribal group called the Sahsum, or Kosampson. Their village was centered around Craigflower Park and Admirals Road. By 1843, the Kosampson moved to the village of Kala on Esquimalt Harbour, which became part of the Esquimalt Indian Reserve in 1853.

In 1850, the title to the territory deemed to be owned by the Kosampson people was sold to James Douglas of the Hudson's Bay Company.

==== Origin of names – Swan Lake and Christmas Hill ====
The origin of Swan Lake's name is not clear. It is listed as such on a map of Victoria in 1885. There is speculation that it was named after James Gilchrist Swan, an American journalist, reservation schoolteacher, lawyer, judge, school superintendent, railroad promoter, natural historian, and ethnographer. Though based in Port Townsend, Swan visited on occasion in the early 1880s.

The more popular belief is that the name refers to the trumpeter swans that would have visited the lake regularly.

Similarly, there are many conflicting reports about the origin of the name Christmas Hill. During the late 1800s and early 1900s, the hill was variously called Lake Hill and Christmas Hill.

One source (Saanich Municipality) indicates that Christmas Hill was named after Hudson's Bay Company factor Joseph William McKay discovered it on Christmas Day in the early 1840s.

Numerous sources recount the legend of Christmas Hill. Purportedly, on Christmas Eve in 1855, a large bird, which was thought to be a Thunderbird by the Lekwungen peoples of the time, swooped down and carried away a small Lekwungen child from the Fort Victoria area. Men from the fort apparently searched until the child was found playing happily on Lake Hill (as Christmas Hill was called then) on December 25. Because of this Christmas miracle, the hill's name was changed.

The names Swan Lake and Christmas Hill were finally officially confirmed by the Geographic Board of Canada on May 1, 1934.

==== Murder on Christmas Hill ====
On November 5, 1852, Peter Brown, a shepherd of the Hudson's Bay Company, was murdered on Christmas Hill. The suspects were a "leading Cowichan Brave and the son of a Nanaimo chief" who had stayed with him the night before.

Sir James Douglas, then governor, led the chase himself, sailing to the Cowichan River aboard HMS Beaver. Here, following a confrontation with over 200 members of the Cowichan tribe, Douglas apprehended the first suspect. They proceeded north to Nanaimo, where they gave chase to the second suspect, apprehending him at what was subsequently known as Chase River (just south of Nanaimo). The two suspects were tried in Nanaimo Harbour in the first trial by jury to take place on Vancouver Island. Both were declared guilty, and were sentenced to hang on Protection Island, at a place that became known as Gallows Point.

==== Farming history ====
Swan Lake and Christmas Hill have a long history of farming, beginning with a sheep farm on the west slopes of Christmas Hill established by Kenneth McKenzie in 1857, and continuing through to the closing of the Pendray dairy farm at Swan Lake in 1978.

An 1885 map of the area shows three land owners, with 100 to 150 acres each:

- John Caspar Von Allman, from the summit of Christmas Hill north
- Kenneth McKenzie, from the summit south to the middle of Swan Lake
- James Stockend, south from the middle of the lake

Little is known about the Von Allman farm, other than a suggestion that it was largely fruit orchards. Vanalman Avenue, just west of the Pat Bay Highway, was named after him.

===== McKenzie farm =====
Kenneth McKenzie and his family arrived in Victoria in 1853; he was an employee of the Hudson's Bay Company. While he was developing the Craigflower area, he established a sheep station on Christmas Hill, and subsequently purchased the lands extending from the summit of Christmas Hill to the middle of the lake. In 1866, he moved his family to a newly built home on the west slope of Christmas Hill. He continued to tend his sheep, cattle and horses, and raise vegetables until his death in April 1874. In April 1884, the property was subdivided into 110 lots of 5 acres each, and sold for $110/acre. Kenneth's daughters, Agnes and Wilhemena, lived in the farmhouse until their deaths in 1928 and 1929, respectively.

===== Rogers farm =====
George Rogers Senior came to Victoria in 1886, and worked as a tenant farmer. He leased, and later purchased, in 1903, the Von Allman farm on the north side of the hill. At first it was known as the Alderlea Farm, but because another farmer claimed prior use of the name, Rogers renamed his farm Chesterlea. George Junior took over his father's duties, and in 1925 he constructed his family house on Rogers Avenue. At this time, the dairy farm was 91 hectares (220 acres).

A portion of the Rogers farm is now occupied by Rogers Elementary School. A large portion of the farm was sold to Saanich for the nature sanctuary, and a small part of the farm was subdivided for residential development. The Rogers family's role in this area is commemorated in the nearby road names - Rogers Avenue, Lily Avenue (George Senior's wife), Genevieve Road (George Junior's wife) and Chesterlea Road.

===== Pendray dairy farm =====
One of the first major parcels of land around the lake that was purchased for the nature sanctuary was the 12-hectare Pendray farm, on the east side of the lake. Joel Pendray began operating the dairy farm there in 1917. His son Tom continued after Joel's death in 1954. This was the last dairy in Victoria to sell raw (unpasteurized) milk. The farm was in operation until March 1978 when the land was turned over to the nature sanctuary.

===== Girling farm =====
In October 1912, the Girling family established a small hobby farm at Swan Lake, between Ralph Street and the lake, bordered by Lancaster Road to the west. Anne Alice Girling, one of the daughters, had studied photography in England before they came to Victoria, and left a treasure of photographs at Swan Lake and Christmas Hill in the early 1900s. Her collection has been preserved and stored at the Saanich Archives.

==== Swan Lake Hotel ====
The Swan Lake Hotel was located on the south side of the lake in 1864, on Saanich Road opposite Falmouth, directly above the south wharf. The hotel was reputed to be excellent for fishing, spring and summer, and perfect for ice skating in the winter. This was Saanich's first year-round recreational resort. In January 1894, the hotel burned to the ground. As it was a popular and successful resort, it was quickly rebuilt. It burned to the ground again in October 1897, with the occupants barely escaping with their lives. However, it was never rebuilt after the 1897 mishap.

==== Other historical notes ====
James Baker of the Victoria Ice Company and Baker's Brick Yard harvested ice from Swan Lake between 1889 and the early 1900s. The ice was packed in sawdust to keep it frozen and would be sold throughout the year to households for their kitchen iceboxes.

== Lake pollution and eutrophication ==
By the 1960s, Swan Lake was becoming eutrophic and polluted. The lake was gradually filling with sediment, making it more shallow. It was also receiving an influx of nutrients, causing it to become more productive over time.

As the city expanded around the lake area, the lake went through a period that has been referred to as "rampaging cultural eutrophication," greatly accelerating the natural processes of the lake. Three "cultural" sources of nutrients were added to the inflow of the watershed: fertilizers from the Blenkinsop Valley and Swan Lake farms, effluent from a sewage treatment plant at Quadra and McKenzie (serving almost 500 homes), and two wineries, which between them discharged more than 2,000 kilograms of sludge from the fermentation process into the inflow stream each year.

This gross overloading of nutrients into the shallow, warm lake led to problems. These conditions supported huge amounts of plant and planktonic growth. Swan Lake became thick with algae during the summer months. As all this material died and was broken down by bacteria, large amounts of oxygen were consumed, and the lower water levels of the lake became devoid of oxygen, or anoxic. The warm temperatures and lack of oxygen made survival impossible for cold-water fish such as trout. Large fish kills were reported as early as 1952.

The other problem associated with an abundance of growth is the production of methane and hydrogen sulfide gases by anoxic bacteria. The lake, stratified into various levels by variations in water temperature during the summer, would "turn over" in the fall, bringing these foul-smelling gases to the surface. This was an occurrence for nearly twenty years, giving Swan Lake the reputation for being a cesspool, shunned by anyone with a sense of smell.

In 1963, the Municipality of Saanich announced plans to clean up the lake. In 1975, the entire Swan Lake area was connected to the city sewer system, at least diverting, if not solving, the problem. The lake continues to turn green and thick with duckweed in the summer, and will likely always return to this state, because of its location and size. Oxygen levels are still low in the deeper waters of the lake, but trout coming up from the Colquitz river are able to survive for much of the year now. The lake is gradually returning to a state of equilibrium, and is currently being monitored for its oxygen and eutrophication levels.

== Saanich land acquisition ==
The Swan Lake Christmas Hill Nature Sanctuary Society was formed and officially incorporated under the BC Society Act on June 16, 1975.

The sanctuary's story actually began over a decade earlier. In the early 1960s, the Municipality of Saanich began acquiring lands around Swan Lake and Christmas Hill with the aim of retaining the area in its natural state, for the use and enjoyment of the public.

By 1973, the municipality felt that it was time to start opening and operating the site. An imaginative proposal was produced and published by Saanich's Planning Department, which called for extensive development work on what would be a sanctuary which would preserve the unique ecological assets of the site and provide excellent educational facilities.

The 1973 proposal also advocated completion of acquisition of lands around the lake, the upper parts of Christmas Hill, and a connecting corridor of land between the two sites. Thanks to substantial investments of funds by the National Second Century Fund of B.C. and the provincial Greenbelt Fund, the remaining lands around the lake were bought. Only a small number of lots around the edge remained out of public control. Both the organizations mentioned leased their purchases to the Municipality of Saanich on long-term leases at nominal rents, on conditions that the land be used for a nature sanctuary. By 1980, the municipality had also secured sufficient land to assure the availability of the connecting corridor to Christmas Hill. More than half of the land required on the hill had also been bought. Between 1965 and 1978, approximately $650,000 was spent on buying land around Swan Lake for the proposed nature sanctuary.

== Nature Sanctuary Society ==
After consultation with local naturalists, school districts, the University of Victoria and the Regional and Provincial Governments, the municipality decided to assist with the formation of a society under the Societies Act of B.C. to develop and operate the site. It was named the "Swan Lake Christmas Hill Nature Centre Society" and was duly incorporated in June 1975. Many of the organizations consulted along the way became members of the board, and sent representatives to serve on the board, making the sanctuary a community effort.

== Site development ==
The society hired its first staff in the summer of 1975 to carry out an extensive survey of the lands and the lake, and to produce the first site development plans. In the fall of 1975, under a Federal Labour Grant, the first site development projects were undertaken, with the construction of the first section of trail and floating boardwalk, the initial efforts at tree planting and the beginnings of the sanctuary's education program.

The loops trail around the lake was the first priority for site development. The north wharf below the Nature House was built and installed in 1976, followed by the floating walkway across the lake and finally the south wharf.

As the society did not have a building in which to base its operations, the site crew was given a back corner office space on the main floor of the Municipal Hall. In the spring of 1976, the crew moved into a farmhouse on Ralph Street.

This building served until 1977, when a residence at the end of Swan Lake Road - the current Nature House site - became available. The bedrooms were converted into offices, the dining room and living room transformed into the display area/classroom, and the one bathroom (with one toilet) had to meet the needs of staff and classes of children. This house was the headquarters for staff and program activities for ten years.

In 1986, the society began developing plans for a new Nature House facility. The decision was to remove the original house and build a new base of operations on the original house's foundation. Beginning with a grant from the Municipality of Saanich, the Society mounted a fundraising campaign, and by the spring of 1988 had raised another from the community and the Provincial Government, to build and furnish the Nature House and provide some of the displays. The new Nature House was officially opened in September 1988.

In the meantime, work began on the Christmas Hill trail, including the connecting corridor trail from the Swan Lake parking lot to the loop trail on the hilltop. Construction of the trail began in 1987, and was completed and officially opened in October 1992.

== Educational programs ==
Nature education has always been a prime directive for the nature sanctuary. Programs began in 1976 with 850 participants attending in the first year. Participation has since grown to over 20,000 taking part in the Nature House's program per year.

The programs focus on the natural history and ecology of Southern Vancouver Island and are designed to be engaging, accessible and fun. The aim of the programs is to create a deeper public understanding of the living lands and waters of the community to ensure public support for their proper use and care.

The main focus of the programs have been designed to cater to the educational needs of students between kindergarten and grade 7, but programs are also offered for pre-school aged children, family groups and seniors. Longer term educational programs are also offered such as the Adopt A Patch program where volunteer groups embrace and rehabilitate designated plots on the Nature Sanctuary grounds or waterways and learn hands-on ecological restoration skills through curriculum offered by Nature Sanctuary staff.

Educational events are hosted at the Nature House on a wide range of relevant topics. Education staff also offer community programs at low cost so that regional residents can learn best practices for monitoring pollinator biodiversity and freshwater water quality.

== Volunteers ==
Volunteers have always played a key role in the development and management of the nature sanctuary. They were heavily responsible for the initial creation and development of the sanctuary site, and continue to contribute hundreds of hours a year to ensure the safety and maintenance of both the site and the Nature House. Volunteers are on hand to assist with nature education programs, stream restoration activities, invasive plant removal, trail building, working in the native plant garden, providing office assistance, and even leading groups of bird watchers.

== Membership ==
The Swan Lake Christmas Hill Nature Sanctuary derives a portion of its funding from community membership. Membership fees directly support the many conservation, research and education initiatives that take place in the sanctuary, and provide a valuable link between the community and the sanctuary's activities. Members receive a member discount when visiting the gift shop or registering for programs and birthday parties, and get to go behind the scenes at members-only events. Members are invited to take part in shaping the future of the Nature Sanctuary by voting at the Annual General Meeting.

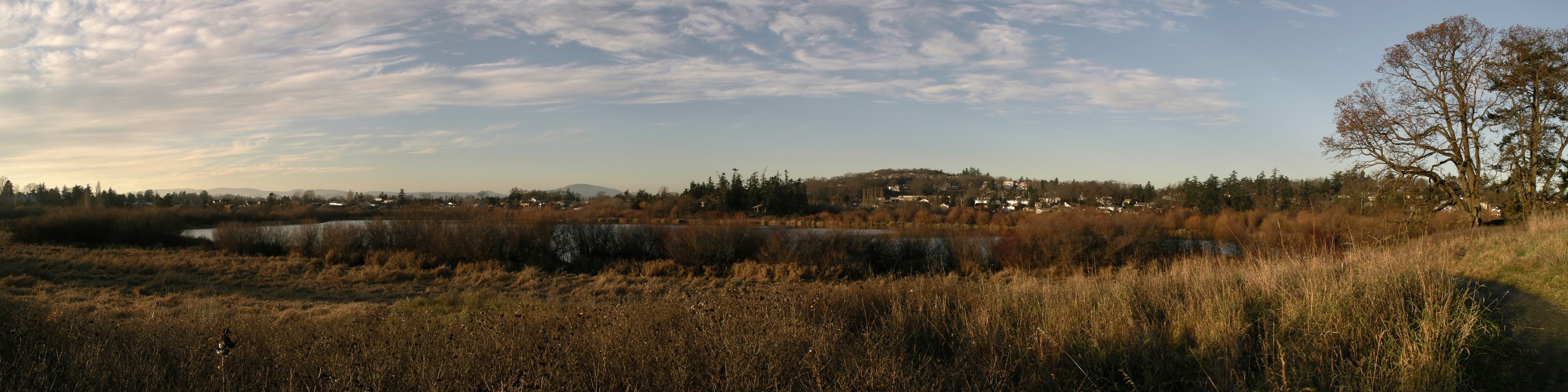
Swan Lake, seen from one of the sanctuary's walking trails

== Facilities ==
=== Swan Lake Christmas Hill Nature House ===
The Nature House hours are published on their website, and admission is by donation. It contains a library, a bee colony, offices, a classroom, nature exhibits, and a turtle. Classroom space is available for rent after opening hours, and many community events are hosted there.

=== Boardwalks and trails ===
The sanctuary has a total of 3.75 km of trails, consisting of 2.5 kilometres of gravel-surfaced loop trail around Swan Lake and 1.25 km in the Christmas Hill portion of the sanctuary. There is one wharf, several wooden bridges, and a boardwalk across one end of the lake.

The wharves and floating boardwalk were originally built by members of the Canadian military. The floating boardwalk offered an unprecedented level of access to the lake water, a facility unique in the Capital Region. It quickly became the focus of many of the education programs, providing opportunities for bird-watching and lake water studies. The original floating boardwalk was in place until 2018, when it was decided that in order to accommodate the winter water levels in the lake and keep visitors safe, a new, longer boardwalk was to be constructed in two phases. The new boardwalk was unveiled in October 2018 to a fanfare of community support. In 2020, the South Wharf was removed.

=== Native plant garden ===
A native plant garden was completed near the nature house in 1998, after four years of work. The garden houses 70 types of flowers and shrubs, all native to Southern Vancouver Island, and includes stone steps leading up to the nature house, a drip fountain, several benches, and a hidden area with bird feeders. The native plant garden was specially designed to keep the plant species hydrated.

== Rules and regulations for the sanctuary ==
Some regulations governing activities and behaviors arise from Board policy, and some are under municipal bylaw authority.

Saanich Bylaws:

1) Dog Bylaw (Regulation of Animals Bylaw No. 8556)

Because of the designation of the Swan Lake Sanctuary space as a migrating bird refuge, no dogs are permitted on any of the trails surrounding the lake.

2) Bike Bylaw (Parks Management and Control Bylaw, No. 7753)

Due to the narrow and rocky nature of the trails, bikes are not permitted on the trails around the lake area, except for in the parking lot or paved roadway.

The Sanctuary Board policies for land use also prohibit recreational boating, fishing and swimming in the lake.
