= Mount Douglas, Saanich =

Mountain in British Columbia, Canada

Mount Douglas
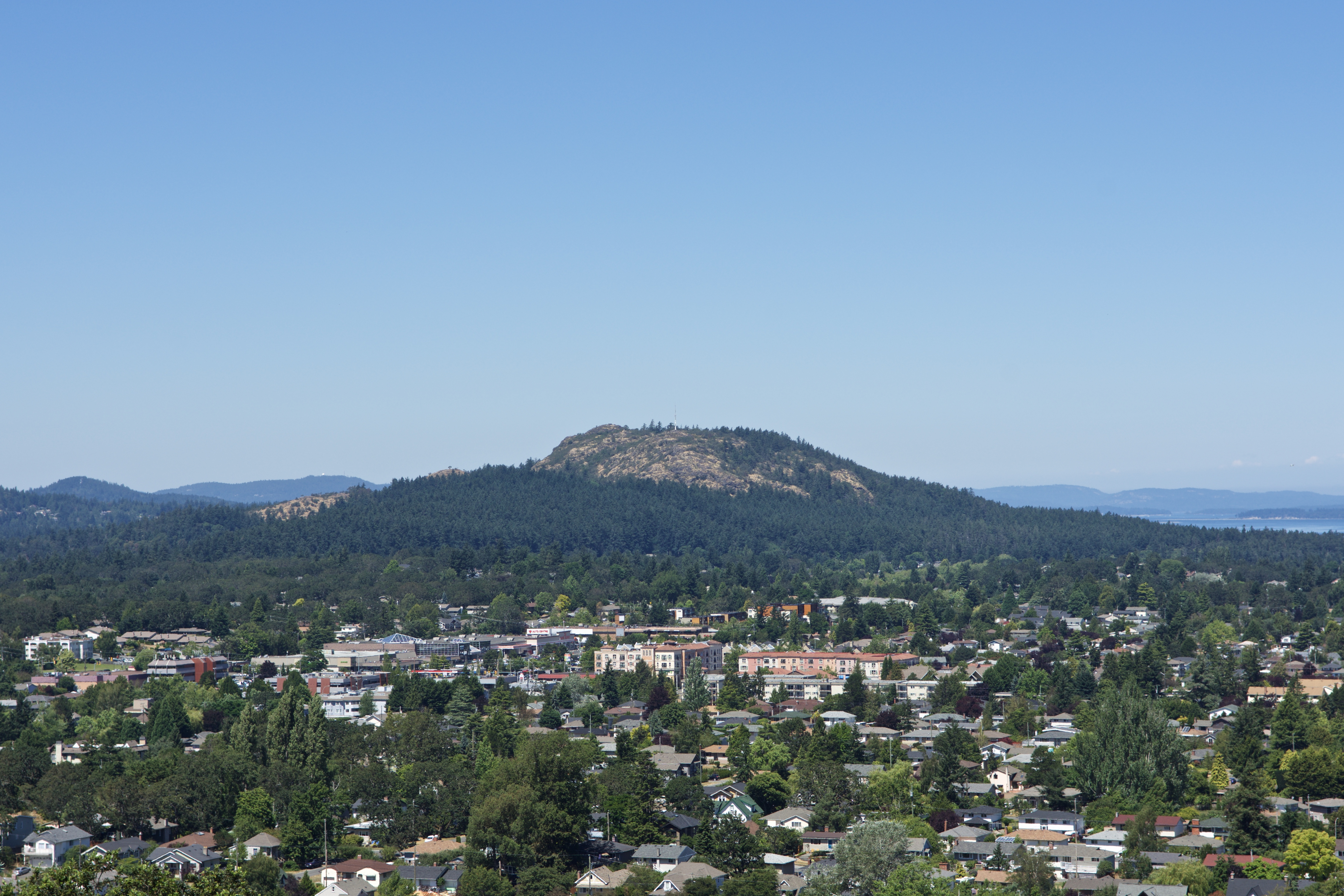
- Mount Douglas from the south

Highest point
- Elevation: 225 m (738 ft)
- Prominence: 225 m (738 ft)
- Coordinates: 48°29′35.05″N 123°20′48.44″W

Naming
- Native name: PKOLS

Geography
- Location within Capital Regional District Location within Vancouver Island Location within British Columbia
- Location in Mount Douglas Park
- Country: Canada
- Province: British Columbia
- District: Capital Regional District
- Topo map: NTS 92B6 Victoria

Mount Douglas (Saanich: PKOLS [pqʼɑls]) is a prominent, 225 m (738 ft) hill in Saanich, British Columbia. It is located in PKOLS (Mount Douglas Park) in the municipality of Saanich.

"Little Mount Douglas" or "Little Mount Doug" is a smaller secondary peak about 150 m (492 ft) west of the main peak.

== Name ==
The Saanich people call the hill PKOLS ([pqʼɑls]), which means 'white stone' in SENĆOŦEN (the Saanich language). The hill is a culturally significant gathering and meeting place for the indigenous Saanich and Lekwungen peoples, which is used for ceremonies and sharing information.

In the mid-nineteenth century, it was called Cedar Hill, and was home to logging operations. Local mills supplied the growing city of Victoria, including the original Hudson's Bay Company fort, transporting lumber south along present day Cedar Hill Road. It was brought under protected status in 1889. Finding no cedars on the hill called "Cedar Hill," Captain Henry Kellett renamed it "Mount Douglas," as recorded in the Fort Victoria Journal by Roderick Finlayson. Although this informal renaming occurred in James Douglas's lifetime (it was given the appellation "Mount" to honour the governor's status), the name "Mount Douglas" was not officially adopted until 1910.

In 2013, an effort was started to restore its indigenous Saanich-language place name. The Reclaim PKOLS movement appealed to the BC Geographical Names Office for a formal name change. On August 15, 2022, Saanich Council approved a request from the W̱SÁNEĆ Leadership Council to move forward with a municipal park name restoration for PKOLS (Mount Douglas Park).

== Neighbourhood ==
The namesake neighbourhood around the base of Mount Douglas is a mix of residential neighbourhoods, hobby farms and working farms, roughly bounded by Cedar Hill Road, Cordova Bay Road, the Blenkinsop Valley and Parkside Crescent. The farms of the Blenkinsop Valley (such as Madrona Farm) are protected by the provincial Agricultural Land Reserve.

== Mine ==
Mount Douglas has fifteen officially designated trails. One trail in particular, on its south side (near the north-most point of Glendenning Trail), has an old abandoned mine. The mine has a small entrance, but it opens up inside. The mine is about 15 to 18 metres (50 to 60 ft) in length.

== Park ==
The hill is located in PKOLS (Mount Douglas Park) in Saanich, BC, which covers 188 ha. It was established as a government reserve in 1858 by Governor James Douglas, and it became Mount Douglas Park in 1889 when the land was transferred to the city of Victoria. Victoria managed the park until 1990 when it was transferred to the District of Saanich.

Located entirely in the Coastal Douglas-fir Biogeoclimatic zone, Mount Douglas contains some of the most endangered and at-risk ecosystems and species in all of Canada. At least six plant and animal species have already been extirpated from park boundaries since its establishment.
