= Sea to Sea Green Blue Belt =

Greenbelt surrounding the Greater Victoria metropolitan area in Canada

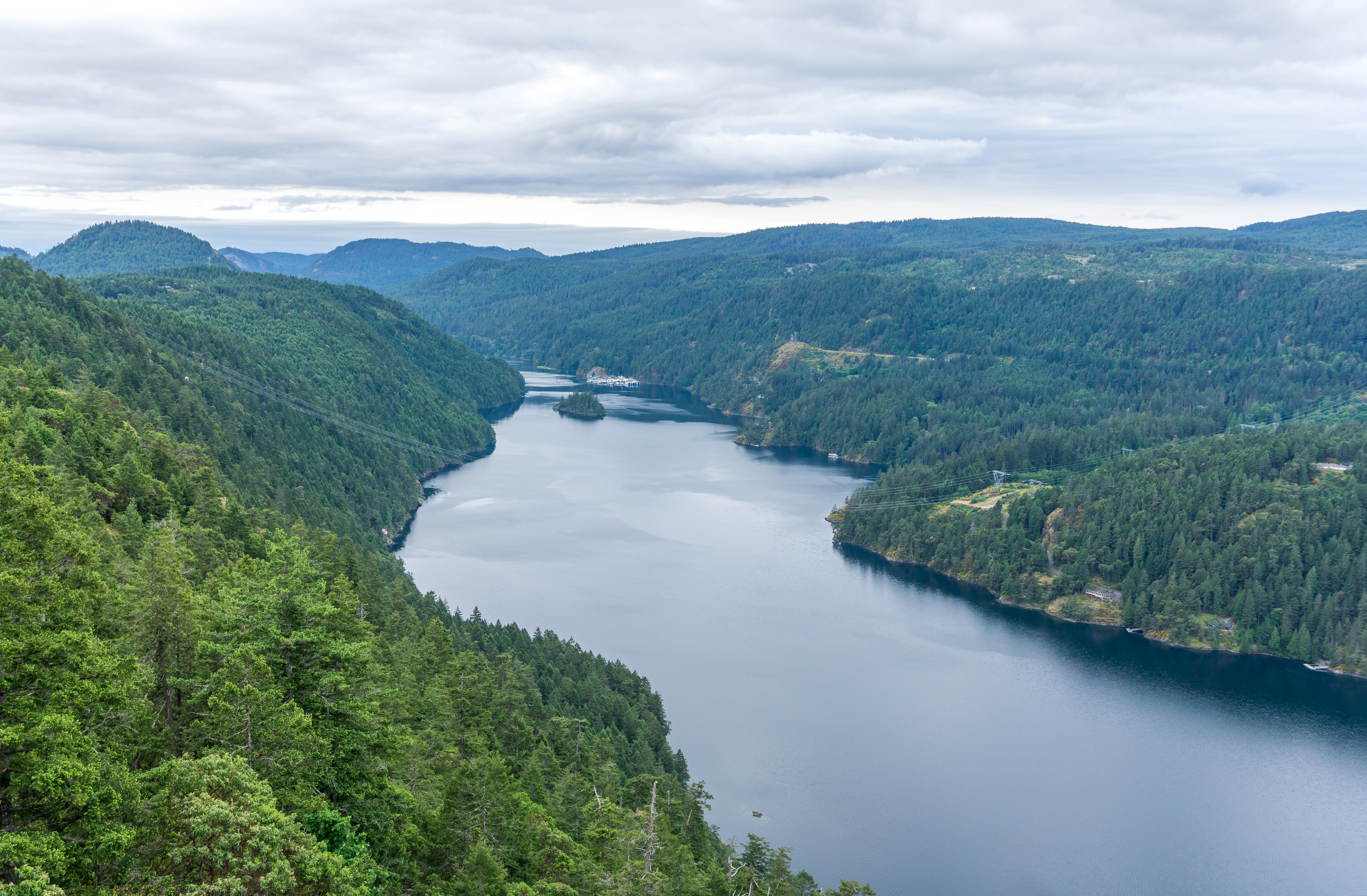
- Finlayson Arm of Saanich Inlet from Gowlland Tod Provincial Park
- Location: Greater Victoria, British Columbia, Canada
- Established: 1994
- Governing body: Capital Regional District
- Website: crd.bc.ca/seatosea

The Sea to Sea Green Blue Belt is a 62 kilometre (39 mi) long greenbelt surrounding the Greater Victoria metropolitan area in Canada. The greenbelt includes green space, forests, farms, and wetlands stretching from Sooke to Salt Spring Island. It also includes the "blue spaces" of Sooke Basin and Saanich Inlet.

== Geography ==
Protected areas contained within the greenbelt include:

- Burgoyne Bay Provincial Park
- Butchart Gardens
- East Sooke Regional Park
- Goldstream Provincial Park
- Gowlland Tod Provincial Park
- Mount Maxwell Provincial Park
- Mount Wells Regional Park
- Mount Work Regional Park
- Sea to Sky Regional Park
- Sooke Mountain Provincial Park
- Sooke Potholes Provincial Park
- Sooke Potholes Regional Park

== See also ==
- Ottawa Greenbelt
