= Sooke River =

River on Vancouver Island, Canada

- Location of river mouth Sooke River (British Columbia)

Location
- Country: Canada
- Province: British Columbia

Physical characteristics
- Source: Sooke Lake
  - coordinates: 48°33′20.1″N 123°41′49.2″W
- Mouth: Sooke Harbour
  - location: Sooke

The Sooke River is a river in British Columbia, Canada, located on the south tip of Vancouver Island, west of Victoria. The river is known for its naturally occurring potholes, which are popular spots for swimming and are one of the main attraction of both Sooke Potholes Provincial Park and Regional Park. It is the second largest river in southern Vancouver Island.

== Etymology ==
The name of the river comes from the name of the indigenous inhabitants of the area, the T'Sou-ke Nation. Their name is said to come from the presence of Stickleback fish that were found at the mouth of the Sooke River. This is also the origin for the names of the town of Sooke as well as Sooke Harbour.

== Course ==
The source of the river begins at Sooke Lake. In 1915, the Sooke Lake Reservoir was constructed at the outlet of the lake, diverting a portion of water from the Sooke River to the Sooke Flowline for the purpose of providing drinking water to Greater Victoria. The Sooke Flowline has been succeeded by the opening of the Kapoor Tunnel.

From the reservoir, the river flows southwards, snaking its way through the valleys of the Sooke Hills. Approximately 2km south of the lake, the Sooke River runs through Kapoor Regional Park. Leechtown, an abandoned 19th century gold mining town, is near the park, where the Sooke river meets the Leech river.

The river continues south as it reaches the Sooke potholes; a collection of rock pools that dot the Sooke riverbed. These naturally occurring pools were created during the last ice age, as large boulders were lodged within the canyon and were swirled around by the rushing river, slowly carving out the potholes that exist today. When the river level drops in the summer, these natural pools become a popular swimming spot for locals. This part of the river is flanked on its east side by Sooke Potholes Regional Park. Further down, the park is flanked on both sides by Sooke Potholes Provincial Park, although the river itself is not part of the provincial park.

Further south, the river exits the Sooke Hills and runs through the town of Sooke. Here it passes alongside many local parks, such as Sunriver Nature Trail Park and Sooke River Park. Finally, the river passes under a bridge carrying the West Coast (Sooke) Highway, before emptying into Sooke Harbour.

The abandoned Canadian Northern Pacific Railway runs alongside much of the east side of the Sooke River, from the town of Sooke to Leechtown. The old rail right-of-way has since been converted to become part of the multi-use Galloping Goose Trail.

== Wildlife ==
The Sooke River is an important river for both Chinook Salmon and Coho Salmon, who use the river as a spawning site every fall.
