= Canadian Northern Pacific Railway =

Historic Canadian railway

Map

The Canadian Northern Pacific Railway (CNoPR) was a historic Canadian railway with a main line running between the Alberta–British Columbia border and Vancouver, British Columbia. It was a wholly owned subsidiary of the Canadian Northern Railway (CNoR). This railway existed mainly on paper, and there were no cars or locomotives lettered "Canadian Northern Pacific". As far as the public and most workers were concerned, it was just a part of the CNoR.

== Mainland ==
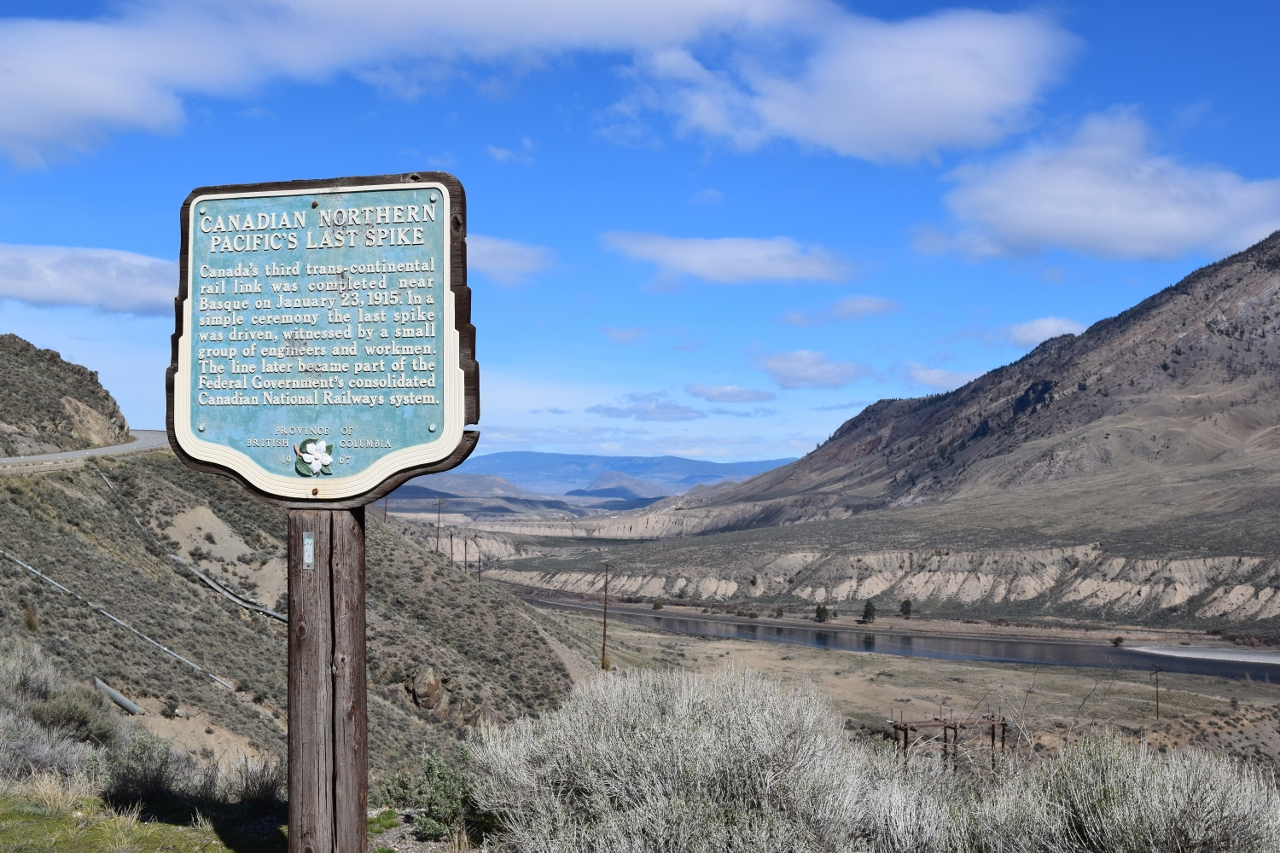
Sign of the Canadian Northern Pacific (CN) Railroad Last Spike

The CNoPR was incorporated in 1910. The last spike was driven at Basque, British Columbia, near Ashcroft, in January 1915. This event completed Canada's third transcontinental railway, which ran from Quebec City, Quebec, to Vancouver, British Columbia.

The line from Edmonton to Vancouver was approved for operation in October 1915. The first westbound passenger train left Edmonton on November 23, 1915. The first eastbound passenger train left Vancouver on November 25, 1915. Initial main line through service was three trains per week in each direction.

== Vancouver Island ==
On Vancouver Island, CNoP had a line that competed with the Esquimalt and Nanaimo Railway (owned by the Canadian Pacific Railway at the time) but went a different route from Victoria. The route would go to Sooke (At the time Milnes Landing), through Leechtown, then pass the west side of Shawnigan Lake to Cowichan Lake. Another section of rail went further northwest to Kissinger. This line was for logging. On December 20, 1918, CNP (Along with Canadian Northern) was absorbed into the CNR.

Originally, the plan was to build the rail line from Victoria to Port Alberni for passenger and freight service. This included a Victoria to Patricia Bay line with a ferry service from Pat Bay to Port Mann on the Fraser River in Surrey. In 1911 work had begun on the up-Island rail; construction was slow throughout the years. The Pat Bay line started construction in 1913 and was completed in 1916, and by 1917 the Patricia subsidiary from Victoria was opened for passenger service. Sometime that year, the Victoria and Sidney Railway and CNoP were linked at Bazan Bay.

In late 1918, the rail line was under the new Crown corporation, the Canadian National Railway. The government had no compulsion to provide a passenger service from Vancouver Island to the mainland; instead CN would serve freight on the island. The ferry that the ex-CNoP ordered arrived that same year from Quebec. It went into refit, and by 1919 the ferry was in service for the Patricia Bay line for freight. That same year passenger services ended on the Pat bay line, but freight continued. The Victoria & Sidney's section from Bazan Bay to Sidney became part of the CNoP in 1919. By 1932 the car ferry, SS Canora, was temporarily withdrawn from service. Two years later, the Sidney Mill burned down. In 1935, the track was abandoned and removed.

Construction continued through up island and by the spring of 1924 the tracks had reached the east end of Cowichan Lake. By 1928, the track reached Kissinger, but the plan to continue to Port Alberni had been abandoned.

From 1922 to 1931, CN ran a passenger and freight service that ran up and down the island. Starting in 1922, service was from Victoria to Sooke (Milnes Landing). The rail was still under construction further up. By 1925 passenger service was extended to Youbou on Cowichan Lake until finally CN dropped the service in 1931.

Logging and freight continued but started disappearing. In 1957, the Kissinger to Youbou rail was closed and abandoned first. Logging by rail was then quickly moved to logging trucks. The next rails to be abandoned were the Deerholme to Saanich track. In 1990, the final surviving tracks were abandoned, completely removing Vancouver Island's second railway. That was not the end of the route, and soon it was revamped for pedestrian and cycling use and is now known as the Galloping Goose Trail.

== Alberta ==
The CNoR maintained other subsidiary companies, such as the Alberta Midland Railway (Vegreville, Alberta, to Drumheller, Alberta), the Canadian Northern Alberta Railway (CNoAR) (St. Albert, Alberta, to the Alberta–British Columbia border) and the Edmonton, Yukon, and Pacific Railway which ran from Strathcona, Alberta, to Edmonton, and later to Stony Plain, Alberta.

The CNoAR was also incorporated in 1910. Construction started at St. Albert in 1910 and the construction train passed into British Columbia around the beginning of 1913.

They were all operated as part of the CNoR system and were taken over by the Crown, upon nationalization in 1918 into Canadian National Railway.

== See also ==
- List of defunct Canadian railways
