= Sooke Potholes =

Sooke Potholes may refer to:

- Sooke Potholes Regional Park - operated by Capital Regional District and The Land Conservancy of British Columbia
- Sooke Potholes Provincial Park - operated by British Columbia Ministry of Environment
