= Leechtown, British Columbia =

Leechtown
- Location of Leechtown in British Columbia
- Coordinates: 48°29′00″N 123°43′00″W
- Country: Canada
- Province: British Columbia
- Region: Vancouver Island
- Regional district: Capital Regional District

Leechtown is at the confluence of the Leech River into the Sooke River in southern Vancouver Island, British Columbia. The ghost town, off BC Highway 1 is about 59 kilometres (37 mi) by road northwest of Victoria.

== Geology ==
Leechtown is notable for its geologic placement, which produced the historical gold finds. The Leech River runs along the Leech River Fault, a major regional fault that marks a distinct geological boundary between the Pacific Rim Terrane and the Crescent Terrane (part of Siletzia). The "Leech River Complex" (also "Leech River Formation" and "Leech River Schist") is a well-known assemblage of highly deformed schists underlain by gneiss. The gold is thought to be derived from quartz stringers concentrated in the schists, emplaced by hydrothermal events related to the regional tectonic activity.

== Name origin ==
The town was named after the river. The Vancouver Island Exploring Expedition, led by Robert Brown, included Lieutenant Peter John Leech of the Royal Engineers. Leech, a former engineer and astronomer, was responsible for documenting the resources discovered. Following observations of gold in July 1864, a tributary of the Sooke River was subsequently named the Leech River.

Leech was later city engineer for Victoria, the capital. John Foley made the initial gold discovery, and Robert Brown spoke the phrase "the gold will speak for itself." Traditionally, Leech has received credit on both counts.

== Mining boom ==
Within weeks, thousands of prospectors, many of whom were veterans of the Fraser Canyon Gold Rush six years earlier, travelled from Victoria overland by trail or by steamer to Sooke. By mid-August 1864, 227 mining licences had been issued. Within a month, over 500 miners were working claims, and surveyed townsite lots were for sale. By November, miners numbered 1,200. Yearend saw 6 general stores, 3 hotels, and 30 saloons. The 12-room Arrarat Hotel was the most prestigious, and was the headquarters for Governor Kennedy, while inspecting the mines. Although as much as $100,000 in gold may have been extracted in the first year, by 1865 the rush was over, and by 1874 the diggings were largely deserted. At its peak, Leechtown and neighbouring Boulder City comprised 4,000 people.

== Railway ==
During the Canadian Northern Pacific Railway (CNoPR) construction from Victoria, the rail head reached just beyond Leechtown, at 2.4 kilometres (1.5 mi) south of Sooke Lake, in October 1912. The Canadian National Railway (CN) acquired the bankrupt CNoPR. The Leechton train station that opened around 1926 was described as no larger than a chicken coop.

In 1943 and 1962, a locomotive plunged through a damaged bridge near Leechton killing a crew member. In 1978, the CN Victoria–Leechtown track was abandoned and the rails removed. In 1987, the CN right-of-way became the Galloping Goose Regional Trail.

== Later mining ==
The Leech River has been worked intermittently since the boom. In the earlier decades, this was principally Chinese prospectors. In the early 1930s, J.S. MacDonald and E. Butterworth installed a small hydraulic plant. High-pressure hoses on the gravel bank did not prove profitable. Vanisle Mines were equally unsuccessful during 1937–1941. The Leech River still has active placer claims, and small scale operations produce quantities of fine gold and flakes. Now a mineral reserve, no new mining claims can be staked.

== Logging ==
A 4-kilometre (2.5 mi) logging railway operated from Leechtown to the Kapoor Lumber Company sawmill in the late 1920s and early 1930s. The Cameron Lumber Company built a steam sawmill on the CN line in the mid-1930s. During the 1940s and 1950s, Leechtown was a thriving logging community. Prior to 2007, TimberWest Forest Corp. owned more than 9,700 hectares (97 km^{2}) of land in the area.

== Kapoor mine ==
At nearby Kapoor was a talc mine, which operated prior to 1930. After that date, mining and the grinding plant switched to green shale. After 1935, the mine continued production throughout the 1940s, but the product was crushed in Vancouver.

== Relics ==
Logging and mining equipment is scattered throughout the area. Vandals damaged the original 1928 cairn, and with treasure hunters, have also destroyed buildings from the mining and logging eras. Indicating the site of the Gold Commissioner's house, the cairn's stolen bronze dedication plate read:

Memorial erected by the B.C. Historical Association on site of gold commissioner's house to commemorate discovery of gold on Sooke River by Lieut. P. Leech, July, 1864, and to mark the site of Leechtown, which sprang up following discovery. Unveiled by the HON. R.BRUCE LIEUT.-GOVERNOR OF B.C. SEPT. 15. 1928.

The 1980s replacement fared equally poorly. In 2014, a new monument was unveiled on the east side of the river at the Kapoor Regional Park to commemorate the 150th anniversary.

== Water catchment ==
During 1915–1970, the Sooke Flowline originated near Leechtown. In 2007, the area was purchased for the Greater Victoria water supply, which protects it from development and prevents public access. The former Leechtown, about 1 kilometre (0.6 mi) south of Sooke Lake and about 6 kilometres (4 mi) north of Sooke Potholes Provincial Park was previously accessible by bike or foot along the Galloping Goose Trail. Since 2012, a warning sign and locked gate before the end of the trail have signified access to Leechtown is prohibited. Strengthening bylaws and installing additional gates and fences have reinforced the restricted access to the watershed area.

== Folklore ==
=== Golden boot ===
In 1855 or 1856, Richard Barter, a Canadian, known as Rattlesnake Dick, and his gang, robbed a Wells-Fargo mule train in California of about $80,000 in gold. In 1859, Californian law enforcement fatally shot him. His $40,000 share of the proceeds is possibly buried somewhere. Allegedly, he found his way to Leechtown to slowly launder the gold, which he kept hidden in a knee-high leather boot buried in the vicinity. The fundamental problem with the story is that the gold rush occurred five years after his death.

=== Hans Christen's cave ===
In 1864, after a storm, Leechtown prospector Hans Christen searched for his missing mule, which he found sheltering inside the entrance of a small cave. Immediately inside the cave, he observed a vein of gold 24 inches wide extending well back. Allegedly a heavy drinker, Christen searched unsuccessfully throughout the remainder of his life to find the cave again.

=== Ed Mullard's cave ===
In an unknown year, Ed Mullard, while hunting in the Jordan Meadows-Leechtown area, discovered a cave in the rock, comprising chiseled steps, multiple galleries and treasures. One account has Mullard alone, another includes a man named McLaren, but only Mullard actually entered the cave. The apparent discovery of a cave in the area in 1928 may have inspired the tale.

In April 1959, Mullard told his story to reporter Ted Harris, but died at 56, before he could show Harris the place. The next year, using information Mullard provided, and aerial survey photos, the newspaper organized a fruitless search to locate the cave. A version has Mullard finding Spanish gold ingots, one of which was on public view during the 1980s at the B.C. Ministry of Mines Mineral Titles display, a claim disavowed by the Ministry.

Rumours of a heavy Spanish bronze cannon sighted in the swamps of Jordan Meadows have also circulated.
