= SS Canora =

Former passenger rail ferry in British Columbia, Canada

SS Canora was a passenger rail ferry built in 1918 by Davie Shipbuilding, for the Canadian Northern Pacific Railway (CNP). She ran from Patricia Bay to the Greater Vancouver area of Port Mann. She was supposed to have been the main passenger car ferry but sometime in 1918 when she arrived in BC, the CNP went into bankruptcy and the Government (Canadian National) purchased the company. CN had no compulsion to serve passengers, instead, they would service freight. In 1919, Canora went into service until her forced withdrawal in 1932 due to the depression. In 1935 Canadian National abandoned the track from Saanich to Patricia Bay. By 1937 Canora went back into service but at this time the island ferry terminal moved to the Point Ellice dock. Her retirement was in 1967 and scrapping was in 1968.
