= Big Timber =

Big Timber may refer to:

- Big Timber, Montana, city and the county seat of Sweet Grass County, Montana
- Big Timber (1917 film)
- Big Timber (1950 film)
- Big Timber (TV series)
