= Sooke Region Museum =

Museum in British Columbia, Canada

Coordinates: 48.3843°N 123.7065°W

The Sooke Region Museum is a museum in Sooke, British Columbia, Canada, which explores the human and natural heritage of the region from East Sooke to Port Renfrew on the southern tip of Vancouver Island. Started in 1977, the museum is open year round.

The museum is unusual in Canada as it receives core funding as a result of a referendum where 83% of local residents voted to raise their property taxes to provide operating funds, subsequently the local governments decided to make funding more stable by making the museum a service. The museum also operates the official Visitor Information Centre for the area and a temporary exhibit space. There are outdoor exhibits and a main museum building. One of its most visible attractions is a lighthouse that was originally on Triangle Island, off the north tip of Vancouver Island. The museum averages over 40,000 visitors a year.

The museum operates a gift shop and does special tours, including traditional salmon BBQ's. The museum is also the location of the annual Sooke Summer Night Market. The museum has been involved in both commemorating and exploring the heritage of the region, including helping in the discovery of a historic bake oven in the wilderness and another they have located on their grounds. The museum is currently working on restoring two small rail engines, which they hope to soon have on display. The museum also publishes books, most recently Bringing Water to Victoria. There is also an archival collection housing documents and photographs. The museum has been upgrading its facilities with the support of various agencies, including the federal government. The museum has programs for children.

The museum founded the annual Sooke Fine Arts Show, the largest juried art show on Vancouver Island. They ran the show for 20 years; it is now operated by a separate society. The museum is operated by the Sooke Region Historical Society, which is incorporated under the BC Society's Act and is also a federal registered charity.

The first curator of the museum was Elida Peers, for this and other works she received the Order of British Columbia, which is the highest honour that the Province of British Columbia gives. She continues to volunteer at the museum as the historian.
