= Mount Matheson =

Mountain in British Columbia, Canada

- Location within Vancouver Island Location within British Columbia

Highest point
- Elevation: 292 m (958 ft)
- Prominence: 250 m (820 ft)
- Listing: Mountains of British Columbia
- Coordinates: 48°21′32″N 123°36′37″W

Geography
- Location: British Columbia, Canada
- District: Sooke Land District
- Parent range: Vancouver Island Ranges
- Topo map: NTS 92B5 Sooke

Mount Matheson, at 292 metres (958 ft), is the highest point in East Sooke, British Columbia. From the top there are panoramic views from Cape Flattery to Mount Baker. The bedrock is Eocene-era basalt.
