= Townsite =

Legal subdivision of land for the development of a town or community

A townsite is a legal subdivision of land for the development of a town or community. In the historical development of the United States, Canada, and other former British colonial nations, the filing of a townsite plat (United States) or plan (Canada) was often the first legal act in the establishment of a new town or community.

== Townsites in British Columbia ==
Numerous townsites were filed in British Columbia, Canada, in the early 19th century. Some of those filed in what is now Metro Vancouver included:

- Granville Townsite, 1870 (Gastown, Vancouver)
- Hastings Townsite, 1869 (Vancouver)
- Moodyville Townsite, 1865 (City of North Vancouver)
- New Westminster Townsite, 1860 (original capital of Colony of British Columbia, now New Westminster)
- North Vancouver Townsite, 1907 (City of North Vancouver)
- Port Mann Townsite, 1911 (Surrey)
- Steveston Townsite, 1889 (Richmond)

Although most of these townsites were incorporated into newly created cities and municipalities of Metro Vancouver, official survey plans still continue to designate lots as being part of these townsites. For example, a 2008 strata plan in Vancouver's Gastown is indicated as being in the Granville Townsite.

Townsite planning was either done by government authorities or by private developers. In the case of North Vancouver townsite in 1907 most of the land was owned by the North Vancouver Land and Improvement Company. By owning large amount of land they were able to plan on a grand scale. New Westminster was surveyed by the Royal Engineers under government direction.

As existing towns grow, they develop Official Community Plans (OCPs) that expand upon the already existing townsites. However, periodically new communities are still created. In 1975, the Whistler townsite was created and eventually incorporated as a municipality. The new municipality was given 53 acres (210,000 m^{2}) of Crown land to develop the townsite.
