= Royal Canadian Marine Search and Rescue =

Marine rescue service

- Formation: 1978
- Headquarters: Headquarters and Training Centre
- Location: Sooke, BC
- Region served: Coast of BC and the inland waters of the Shuswap
- Chief Executive Officer: Bill Riggs
- Volunteers: Over 950
- Website: http://www.rcmsar.com/

Royal Canadian Marine Search and Rescue (RCMSAR) is a volunteer marine rescue service that saves lives and promotes public recreational boating safety throughout the coastal and some inland waters of the province of British Columbia and is associated with the national organization of the Canadian Coast Guard Auxiliary.

== History ==
Volunteers have been an integral part of marine rescue response services along the British Columbia coast for more than 100 years, initially as part of the Canadian Life Saving Service (CLSS). The Canadian Coast Guard was formally established in 1962 and shortly thereafter engaged volunteers called Volunteer Search Masters (who operated suitable boats equipped with VHF radio communication) and Volunteer Marine Rescue Agents (who were local coastal contacts for Coast Guard Rescue Officers and who established "posts" in coastal communities for providing information and communications related to search and rescue incidents in the nearby waters).

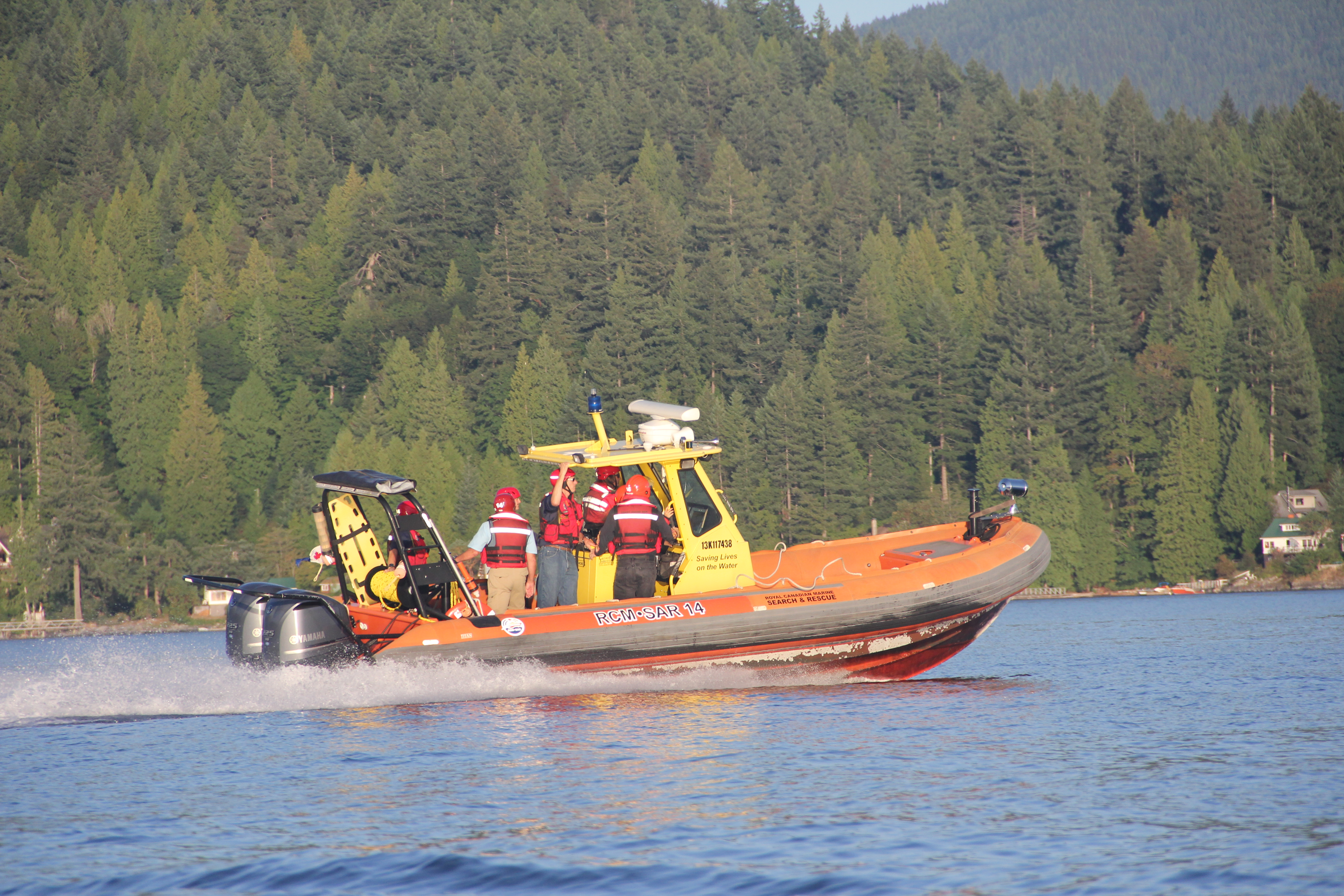
RCMSAR Unit 14 patrolling British Columbia pacific waters

In 1978, the Canadian Coast Guard established the Canadian Marine Rescue Auxiliary across Canada in order to involve volunteers in marine rescue assistance and rescue prevention education. This national auxiliary program provided funding for volunteer operations such as reimbursement of fuel costs and insurance coverage, when volunteer boats and crews were formally tasked to respond to marine incidents by the Victoria (Joint) Rescue Co-ordination Centre (JRCC) of the Department of National Defence (DND).

In 1997, the Canadian Marine Rescue Auxiliary underwent a name change to become the Canadian Coast Guard Auxiliary. In May 2012, the Canadian Coast Guard Auxiliary - Pacific Region rebranded under the name Royal Canadian Marine Search and Rescue or RCMSAR. The Royal Canadian Marine Search and Rescue Inc., became the legal name of the organization in 2017.

== Operations ==
More than 950 volunteers operate 29 rescue stations on the west coast of British Columbia and in the inland waters of the Shuswap in BC's interior. There is also a Boating Safety station in Vancouver. Collectively they respond to an average of 450 - 500 missions per year, or about one quarter of all marine emergencies on the BC coast. A small paid staff at the RCMSAR Headquarters and Training Centre in East Sooke near Victoria supports operations, training and volunteer members. The training centre features a classroom, marine simulator, and student accommodation.

RCMSAR is reimbursed for missions and on-water training from the Canadian Coast Guard through a Contribution Agreement in support of the Coast Guard's marine search and rescue mandate. Funding is also provided by the Province of British Columbia through Community Gaming Grants for vessels and equipment. RCMSAR also depends on donations from individuals, corporations, and community and private foundations.

In 2017, RCMSAR signed a memorandum of understanding with the Province of British Columbia to allow local authorities and provincial agencies to request assistance from RCMSAR directly in times of emergency specifically related to their jurisdictions. Marine search and rescue in federal waters remains RCMSAR's core operation and primary support function. In 2017, RCMSAR also signed a memorandum of understanding establishing a relationship with the 4th Canadian Ranger Patrol Group for the purpose of training and operational collaboration.

== Resources ==
=== Equipment ===
RCMSAR is equipped with a variety of vessels ranging from rigid hull inflatables to large enclosed-cabin waterjet-powered boats. RCMSAR also operates a training simulator at their East Sooke Training Centre, featuring a full-scale enclosed cabin vessel, large screen, digital projectors and sound. The simulator mirrors RCMSAR's "Brewin" vessel used for on-water training.

=== Vessels ===
==== Type 1 Fast Rescue Craft ====
Design: Rigid Hull Inflatable

Length: 9 metres

Power: Twin Yamaha 250 hp Outboard Motors

Range: 250 nautical miles

Speed: 40+ knots

Crew Complement: 4

Features:

- Shockwave Integrated Controlled Environment (ICE)
- Self Righting
- Electronic Navigation Instruments
- Two Marine VHF radios
- Searchlights
- Night Vision (FLIR)
- First Aid Equipment
- Towing Equipment

==== Type 2 Fast Rescue Craft ====
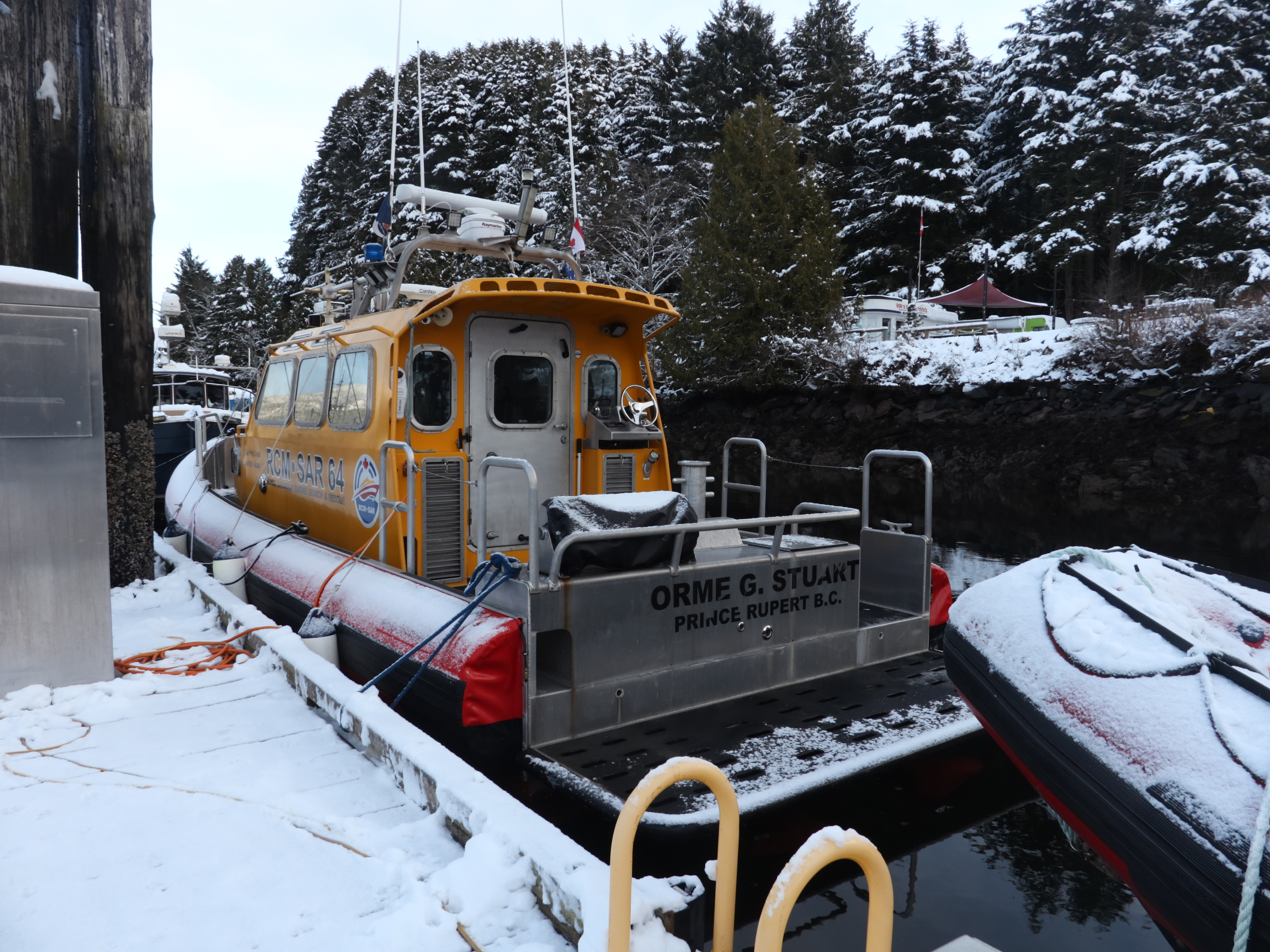
RCMSAR 64 - Orme G. Stuart

Design: Enclosed cabin Rigid Hull Inflatable

Length: 11.12 metres

Power: Twin Diesel Engines and Water Jets (870 hp)

Range: 250-300 nautical miles

Speed: 39 knots

Crew Complement: 5

Features:

- Enclosed cabin for longer, more complex missions
- Self-righting
- Electronic navigation instruments
- Three marine VHF radios
- Radio Direction Finders
- Searchlights
- Night vision (FLIR)
- First aid equipment
- Towing equipment

==== Rigid Hulled Inflatable Boats (RHIBS) ====
Various designs are used such as the Zodiac 733 or the Titan 249.

== Stations ==
=== Southern Region ===
- Station 1 - West Vancouver
- Station 2 - North Vancouver
- Station 4 - Squamish
- Station 5 - Crescent Beach
- Station 8 - Delta
- Station 10 - Richmond
- Station 12 - Halfmoon Bay
- Station 14 - Gibsons
- Station 61 - Pender Harbour
- Station 106 - Shuswap

=== Central Region ===
- Station 20 - Salish Sea (Pender Island)
- Station 25 - Gulf Islands
- Station 27 - Nanaimo
- Station 29 - Ladysmith
- Station 31 - Brentwood Bay
- Station 33 - Oak Bay
- Station 34 - Mill Bay
- Station 35 - Victoria
- Station 36 - Saanich
- Station 37 - Sooke
- Station 38 - Ucluelet
- Station 39 - Port Alberni
- Station 59 - Deep Bay
- Station 60 - Comox

=== Northern Region ===
- Station 45 - Masset
- Station 63 - Kitimat
- Station 64 - Prince Rupert
- Station 65 - Lax Kwa´laams
- Station 70 - Hartley Bay

=== Boating Safety ===
- Station 103 - Vancouver

== See also ==
- Canadian Coast Guard Auxiliary
