= Sooke Basin =

Body of water on Vancouver Island, Canada

Coordinates: 48°22′45″N 123°39′30″W

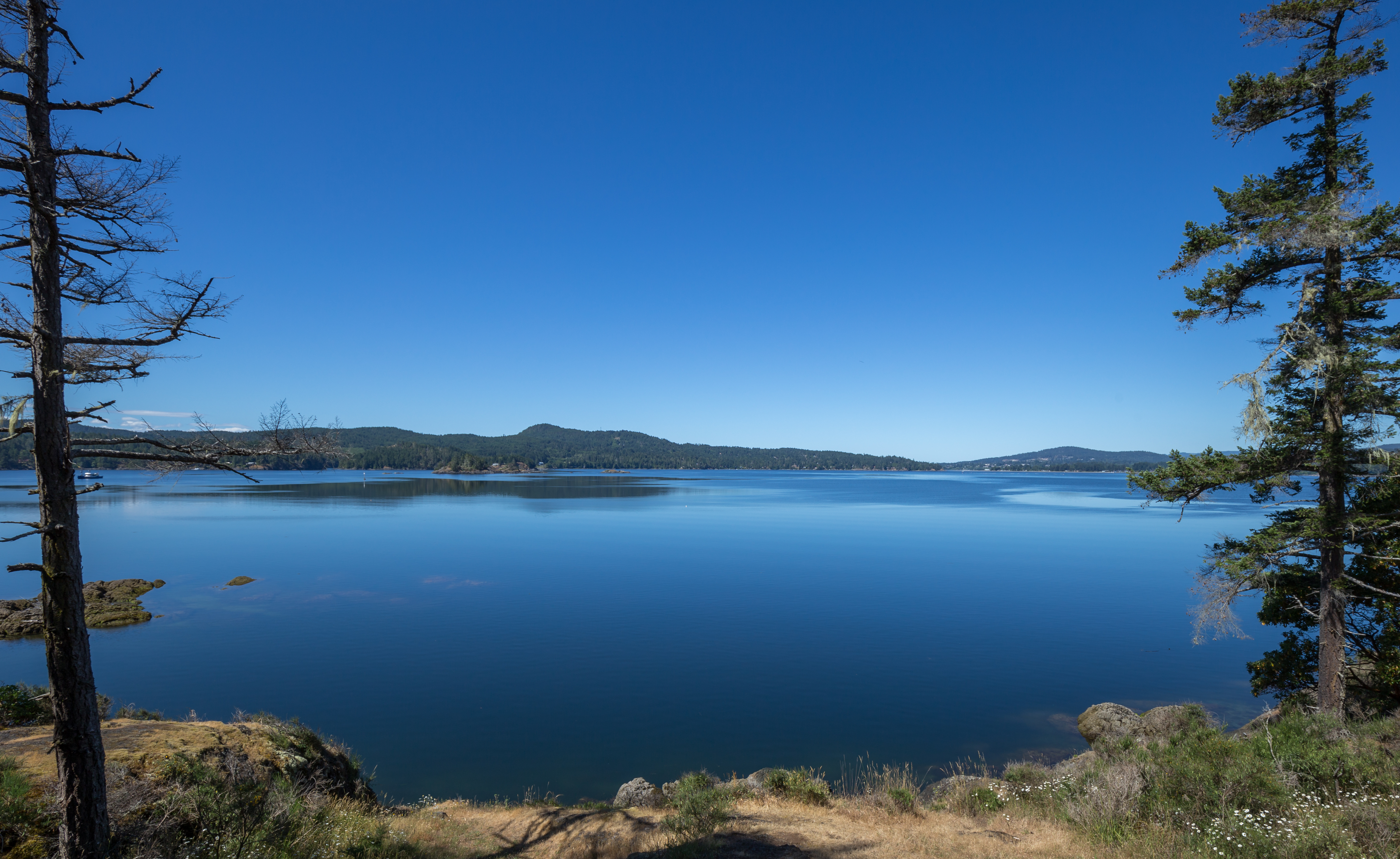
Sooke Basin from Galloping Goose Regional Trail

Sooke Basin is a small (10 km^{2}) body of water on the southern end of Vancouver Island in southwestern British Columbia. It is connected to the Strait of Juan de Fuca by Sooke Harbour, a 4 km long narrow natural harbour.

== Geography ==
Sooke Basin is a salt water body located between Sooke and East Sooke. The shores of Sooke Basin are mostly rock, but along the north shore there are beautiful sandy beaches. Scattered around the remainder are occasional muddy and pebbly beaches.

=== Islands ===
Three small islets form the Goodridge Islands, located in the southeastern portion of the basin.

=== Coves ===
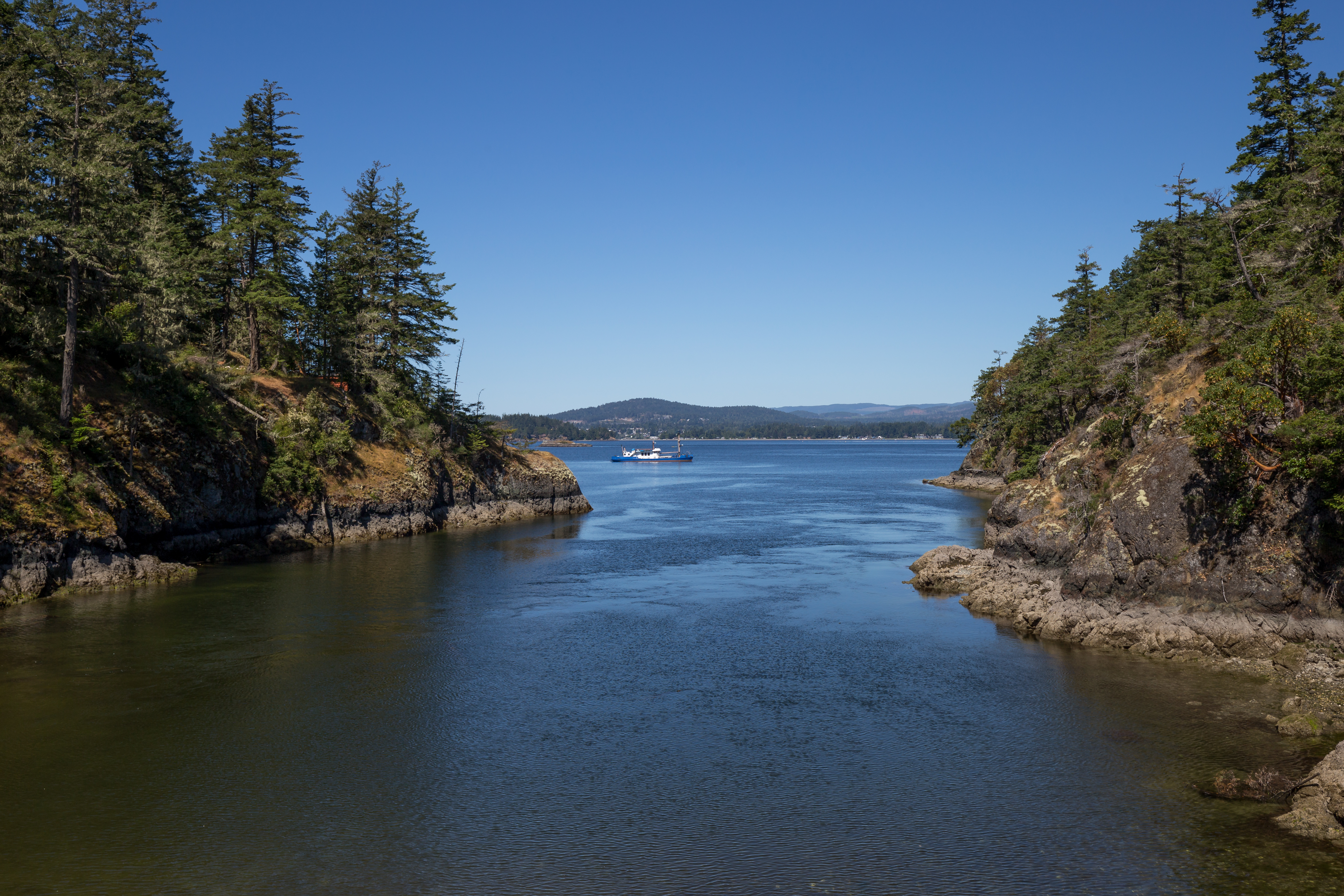
Roche Cove

Roche Cove, a small shallow cove is located on the east end of Sooke Basin and is the focal point of the 143-hectare Roche Cove Regional Park. The narrow mouth of Roche Cove, spanned by a small bridge, makes for interesting passage as the tidal currents can be quite strong. The mouth is passable by small powerboats at mid and high tides. Roche Cove is located at the boundary between Sooke and East Sooke.

Anderson Cove, a small shallow cove is located on the southeast of Sooke Basin. The entrance to Anderson Cove is quite narrow and shallow but is passable with local knowledge at mid and high tides. The shores of Anderson Cove are dotted with expensive East Sooke homes. The only public boat launch in the Sooke Basin and its coves is located in Anderson Cove.

Coopers Cove is formed by the Goodridge Peninsula, the location of a former sawmill and the site of a proposed resort. Goodridge Peninsula was formed when the main portion, previously an island, was connected to the shore of Vancouver Island.

== History ==
Sooke Basin is named for the T'sou-ke Nation of the Coast Salish peoples, the native inhabitants who had a thriving community and are believed to have been living in the general area for several thousand years before the arrival of the first European explorers. The first known European entry into Sooke Basin was by the Spanish, during the 1790 expedition of Manuel Quimper in Princesa Real, with Juan Carrasco as pilot. The Spanish gave Sooke Basin the name Puerta de Revilla Gigedo, in honour of then Viceroy of New Spain, Güemes Padilla Horcasitas, Count of Revillagigedo.

== Communities ==
The northern half of the Sooke Basin is contained within the jurisdiction of the municipality of Sooke, while the southern half is located in the East Sooke portion of the Juan de Fuca Electoral Area.
