= Big Timber (TV series) =

Television series

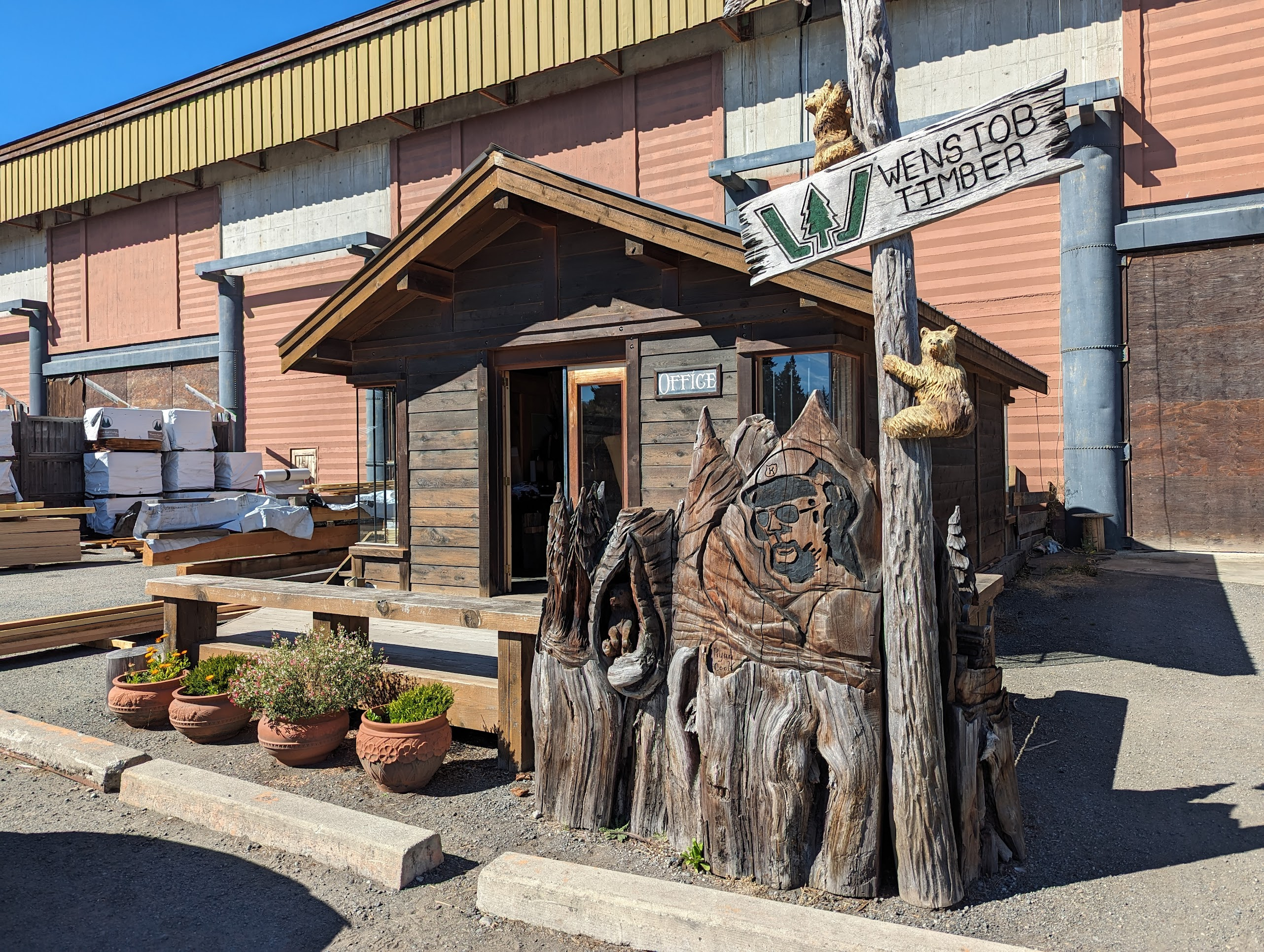
- The office and sawmill of Wenstob Timber Resources
- Genre: professional reality
- Starring: Kevin Wenstob; Sarah Fleming; Erik Wenstob; Coleman Willner; Shanise
- Country of origin: Canada
- Original language: English
- No. of seasons: 3
- No. of episodes: 26

Production
- Running time: 40–42 minutes

Original release
- Network: History Canada
- Release: 8 October 2020 – present

Big Timber is a reality TV series about a timber business on Vancouver Island, Canada. The first season was mostly filmed from September 2019 to January 2020 and first broadcast by the Canadian History channel on 8 October 2020. It has since been purchased and streamed worldwide via Netflix, who helped finance a second season due to its good reception on the streaming platform. The second season was filmed in 2021 and released again on History. The series was also released in its entirety on 18 July 2022 on Netflix. A third season was commissioned during the shooting of season 2, airing in September 2022.

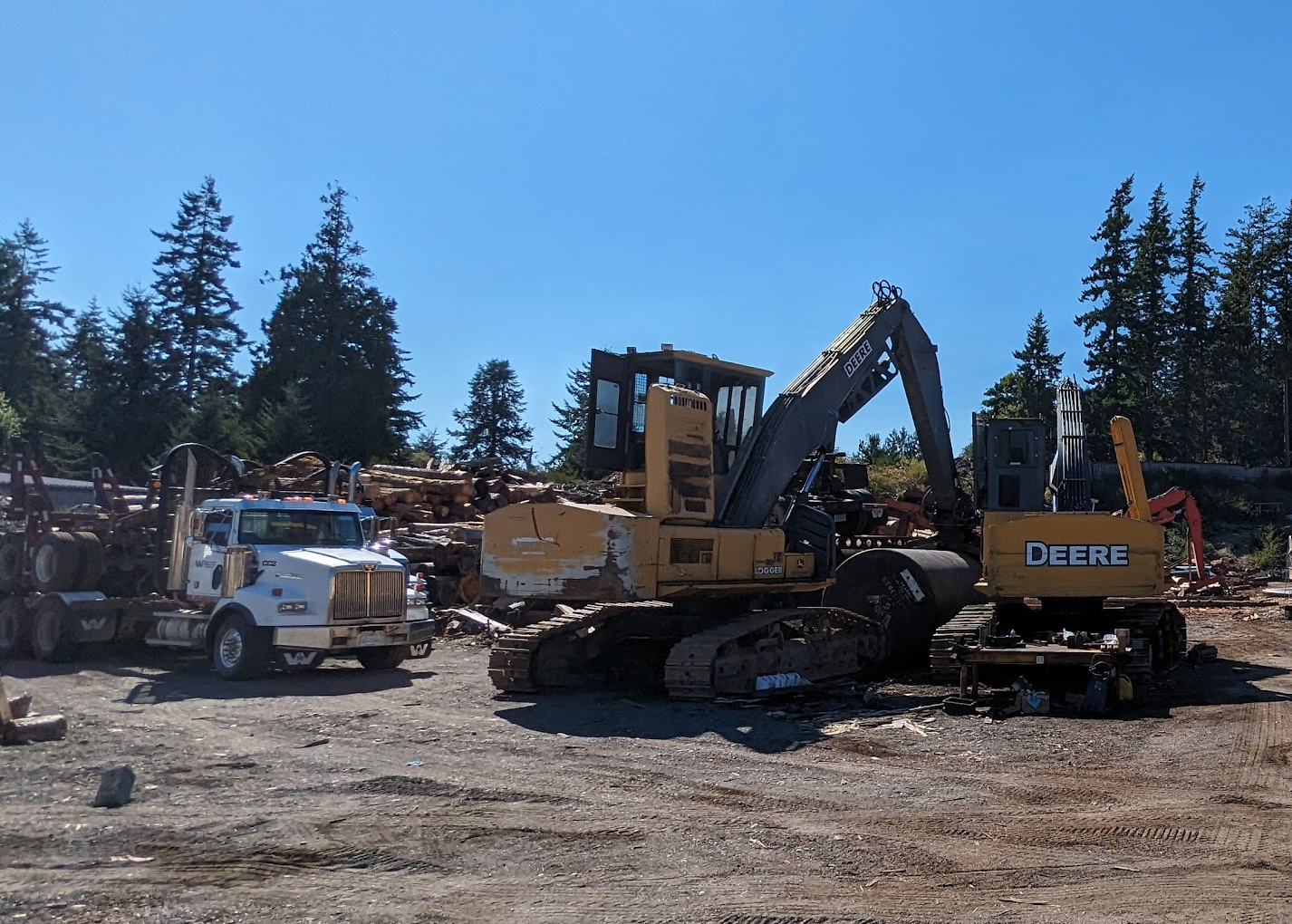
Some of the equipment used by Wenstob

== Wenstob Timber Resources ==
The business at the centre of Big Timber is Wenstob Timber Resources, a limited company whose main site is a sawmill in Sooke. The owner is Kevin Wenstob, who runs it as a family business with his wife, Sarah Fleming, and son Erik. The inventory of equipment includes a barge, a bulldozer, six excavators, eight forklifts, five log loaders, ten logging trucks, a tower yarder and three wheel loaders.

== Cast ==
- Kevin Wenstob – big boss
- Sarah Fleming – mill boss
- Erik Wenstob – head mechanic
- Coleman Willner – Head Sawyer
- "Firewood" John Brebber – logger
- Tyler Lindsay – junior mechanic
- Glen Fox – log buyer
- Shanise - problem solver
- Kevin G - yarder

== Episodes ==
Season 1

In this season, the focus is on clearing the timber from the company's claim on Klitsa Mountain.

No.	Title	Original release date
1	"Ain't No Mountain High Enough"	8 October 2020
2	"Bridge Over Troubled Water"	15 October 2020
3	"Don't Rock My Boat"	22 October 2020
4	"Should I Stay Or Should I Go Now"	29 October 2020
5	"Sink or Swim"	5 November 2020
6	"Gonna Build A Mountain"	12 November 2020
7	"Have You Ever Seen The Rain"	19 November 2020
8	"Hazy Shade of Winter"	26 November 2020
9	"Hot Fun In the Summertime"	3 December 2020
10	"Best Laid Plans"	10 December 2020

Season 2

There's a million-dollar penalty pending for failing to clear a claim in time, but regular logging is still snowed in and so the crew hunts valuable salvage logs by boat.

No.	Title	Original release date
1	"Ready to Start"	14 October 2021
2	"River Deep, Mountain High"	21 October 2021
3	"You Can’t Always Get What You Want"	28 October 2021
4	"Don’t Stop Believing"	4 November 2021
5	"Between the Devil and the Deep Blue Sea"	18 November 2021
6	"Under Pressure"	25 November 2021
7	"The Gambler"	2 December 2021
8	"Ain’t No Stopping Us Now"	9 December 2021

Season 3

The business is expanded by investments and projects including a new sawmill.

No.	Title	Original release date
1	"Taking Care of Business"	29 September 2022
2	"Spinning Wheel"	6 October 2022
3	"Gimme Shelter"	13 October 2022
4	"Future Looks Good"	20 October 2022
5	"Don't Let Him Go"	27 October 2022
6	"Live to Win"	3 November 2022
7	"The Only Way Is Up"	10 November 2022
8	"Perfect Day"	17 November 2022
