= Sooke Potholes Regional Park =

Regional park in British Columbia, Canada

Coordinates: 48.428°N 123.712°W

Sooke Potholes Regional Park is a 63.5-hectare (157-acre) nature park along the Sooke River, near Sooke, British Columbia. It is known for its rocky pools and canyon-like features and is a popular destination for hiking and swimming.

The Land Conservancy of British Columbia (TLC) and the Capital Regional District (CRD) purchased the Sooke Potholes property from private owners in 2005 and 2007. The two organizations work together to manage, plan and develop the park's resources. The 67-site Spring Salmon Place Campground (KWL-UCHUN), located at the northern end of the park, is operated seasonally by the T'Sou-ke Nation. The smaller Sooke Potholes Provincial Park abuts the southern boundary of the regional park. The westernmost portion of the Galloping Goose Regional Trail can be accessed from the park.

The Sooke Flowline, constructed in 1915, snakes through the nearby hills around the Sooke Potholes and travels all the way to the Humpback Reservoir near Mt. Wells Regional Park. It can be found east of the Sooke River.

== History ==
The geologic formations that the park is named for are the result of glacial action around 15,000 years ago. Ice melt from receding glaciers left boulders that then, in concert with rushing waters, carved "potholes" into the sandstone of the river valley.

The area is within the traditional lands of the T'sou-ke Nation. Following European colonization in the nineteenth century, the land was used for farming, fishing, mining, and logging, and later for recreation. Much of the park area was part of the failed Deertrail Resort development, which was proposed in the 1980s. The remains of one of the resort structures can be found in the park. In July 2024, the park was temporarily closed as a precaution due to the Old Man Lake wildfire, which burned approximately 2.3 square kilometres in the area.
