= Galloping Goose Regional Trail =

Rail trail in British Columbia, Canada

Coordinates: 48.42836°N 123.372324°W

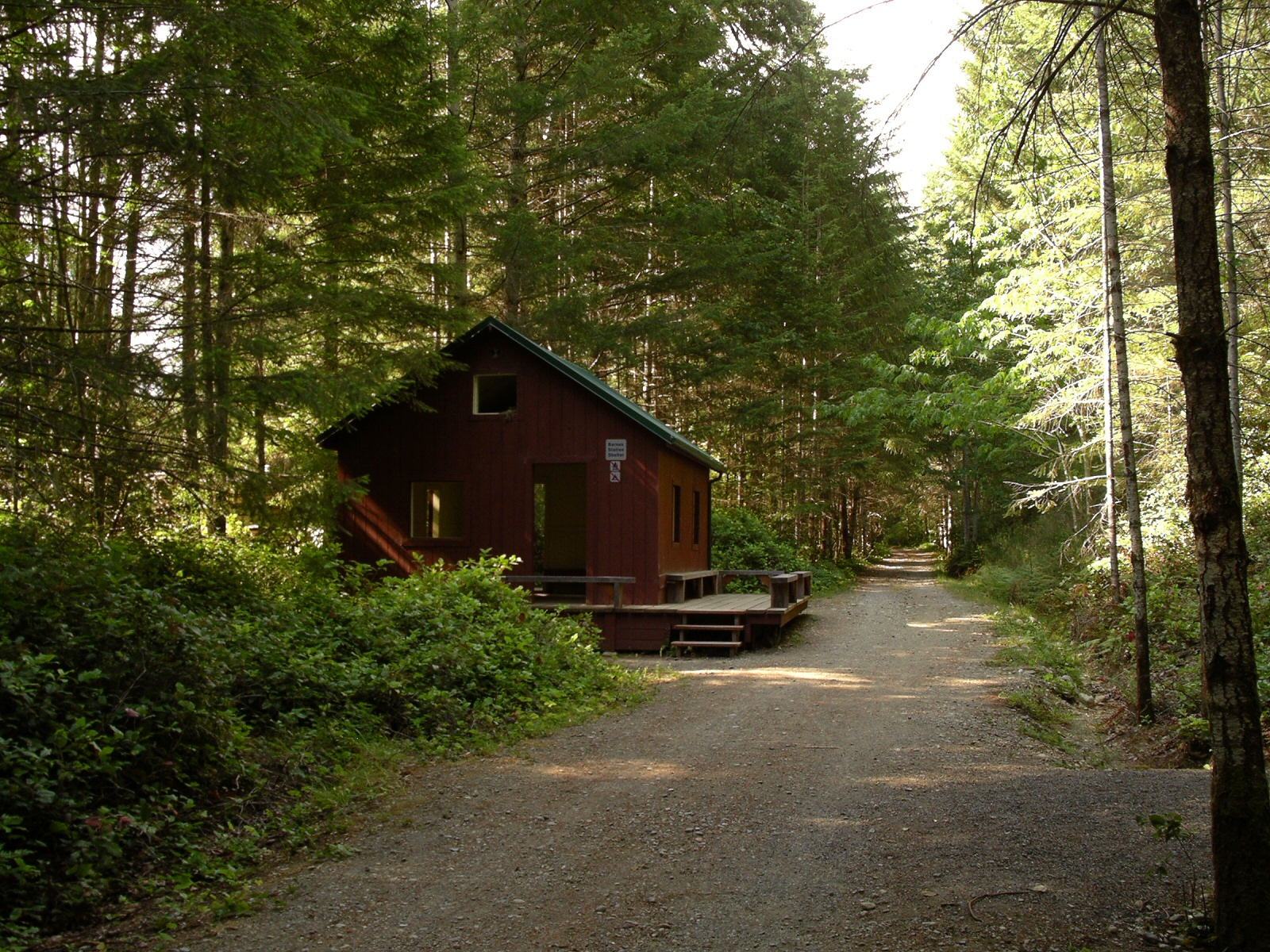
- A restored train station on the Galloping Goose Trail near the Sooke Potholes
- Length: 55 km (34 mi)
- Location: British Columbia, Canada
- Trailheads: Victoria; Leechtown
- Use: Hiking, Running, Cycling, Skateboarding, Horse Riding
- Difficulty: Accessible to Easy
- Hazards: Road Crossings
- Website: www.crd.bc.ca/parks-recreation-culture/parks-trails/find-park-trail/galloping-goose

The Galloping Goose Regional Trail is a 55-kilometre (34 mi) rail trail between Victoria, British Columbia, Canada, and the ghost town of Leechtown, north of Sooke, where it meets the old Sooke Flowline. Maintained by the Capital Regional District (CRD), the trail forms part of the Trans-Canada Trail, and intersects the Lochside Regional Trail. The section from Harbour Road in Esquimalt to the Veterans Memorial Parkway in Langford is also part of the Vancouver Island Trail.

The trail is a popular route both for commuting and recreation, including within urban areas of Victoria (Vic West and Burnside-Gorge). It is frequented by people walking, running, cycling, rollerblading, skateboarding and (in places) riding horses. It connects up with many other trails and parks in the area.

The trail was created in 1987 on the former right-of-way of the Canadian National Railway, and runs through the communities of Sooke, Metchosin, Colwood, Langford, View Royal, Saanich, and Victoria as well as the unincorporated community of East Sooke.

The trail surface is paved between the east terminus (Johnson Street Bridge) to Wale Road in Colwood, approximately 13 km, or one quarter of its total length. It connects to a multi-use path across the bridge and bike lanes along Pandora Avenue.

In 1996 two important connecting links were opened: the rebuilt Selkirk Trestle (across the Selkirk Water). and the Switch Bridge over the Trans-Canada Highway.

The trail was named after the local gas-powered passenger car (No. 15813) that ran on the line from 1922 to 1931.

Although maps show Leechtown as being the end of the trail, this area has been restricted since 2007, as part of the Greater Victoria water supply. In 2010, a warning sign and locked gate were erected before the end of the trail. Leechtown itself is not accessible.

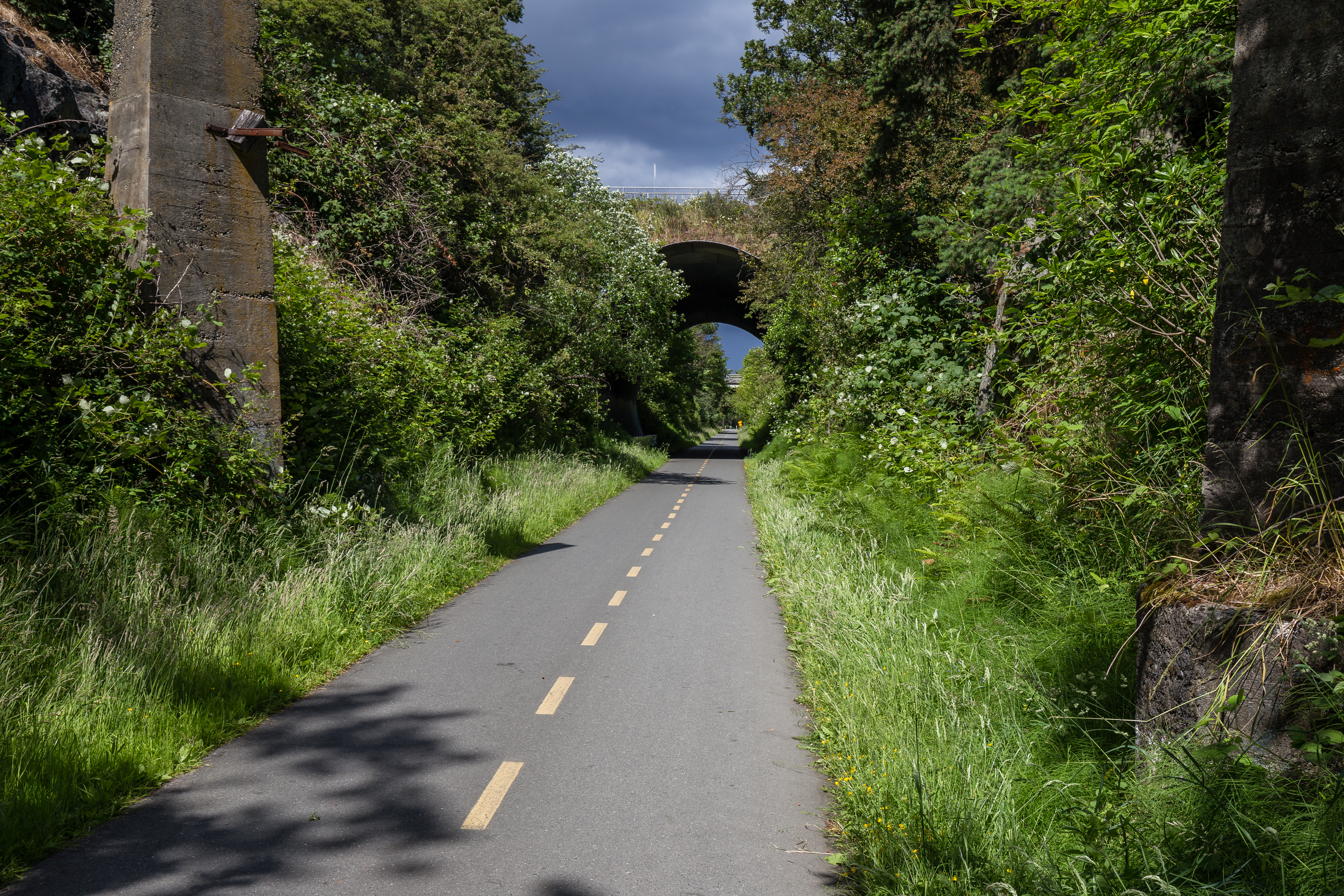
Saanich Area

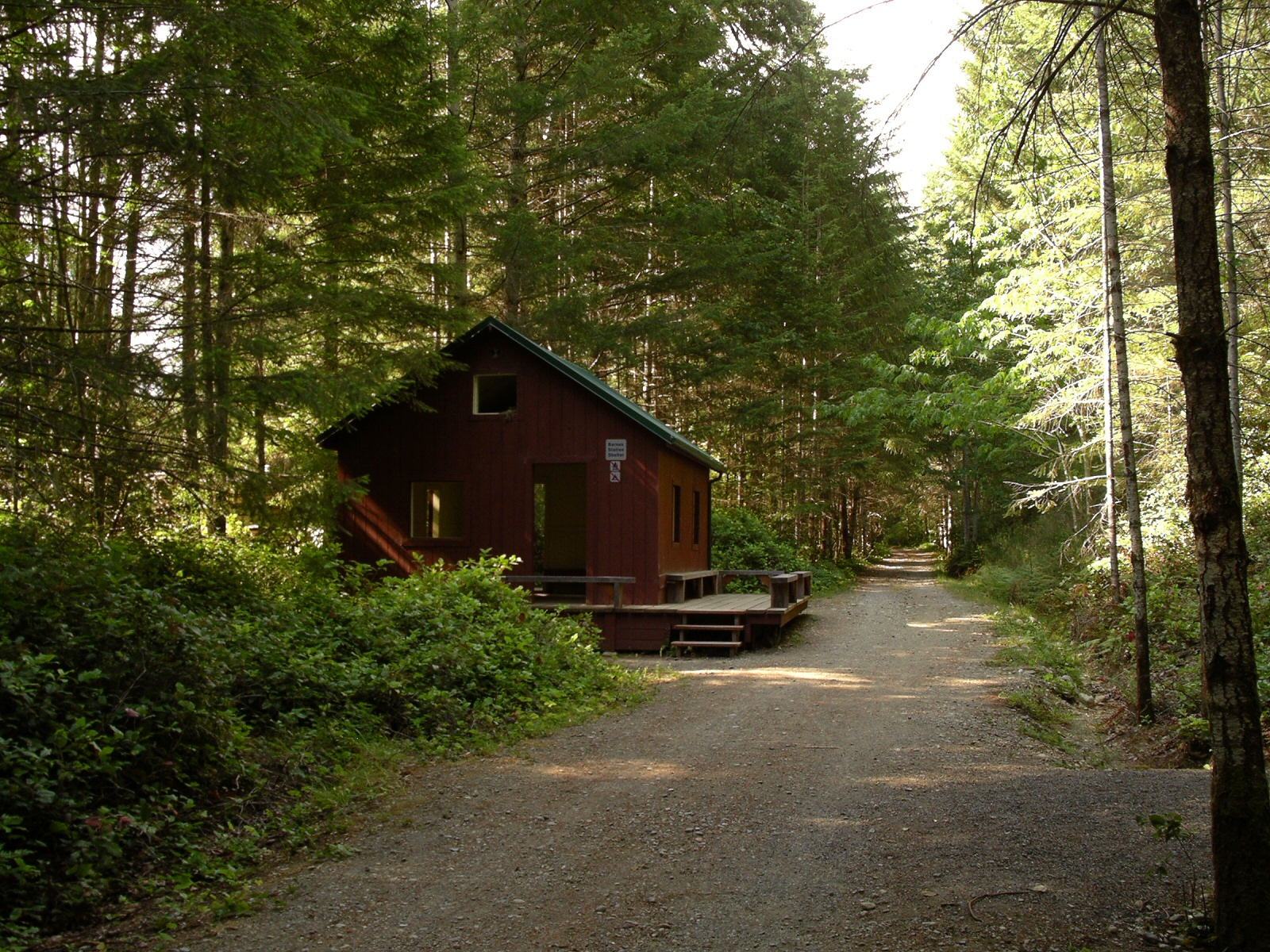
Sooke Area

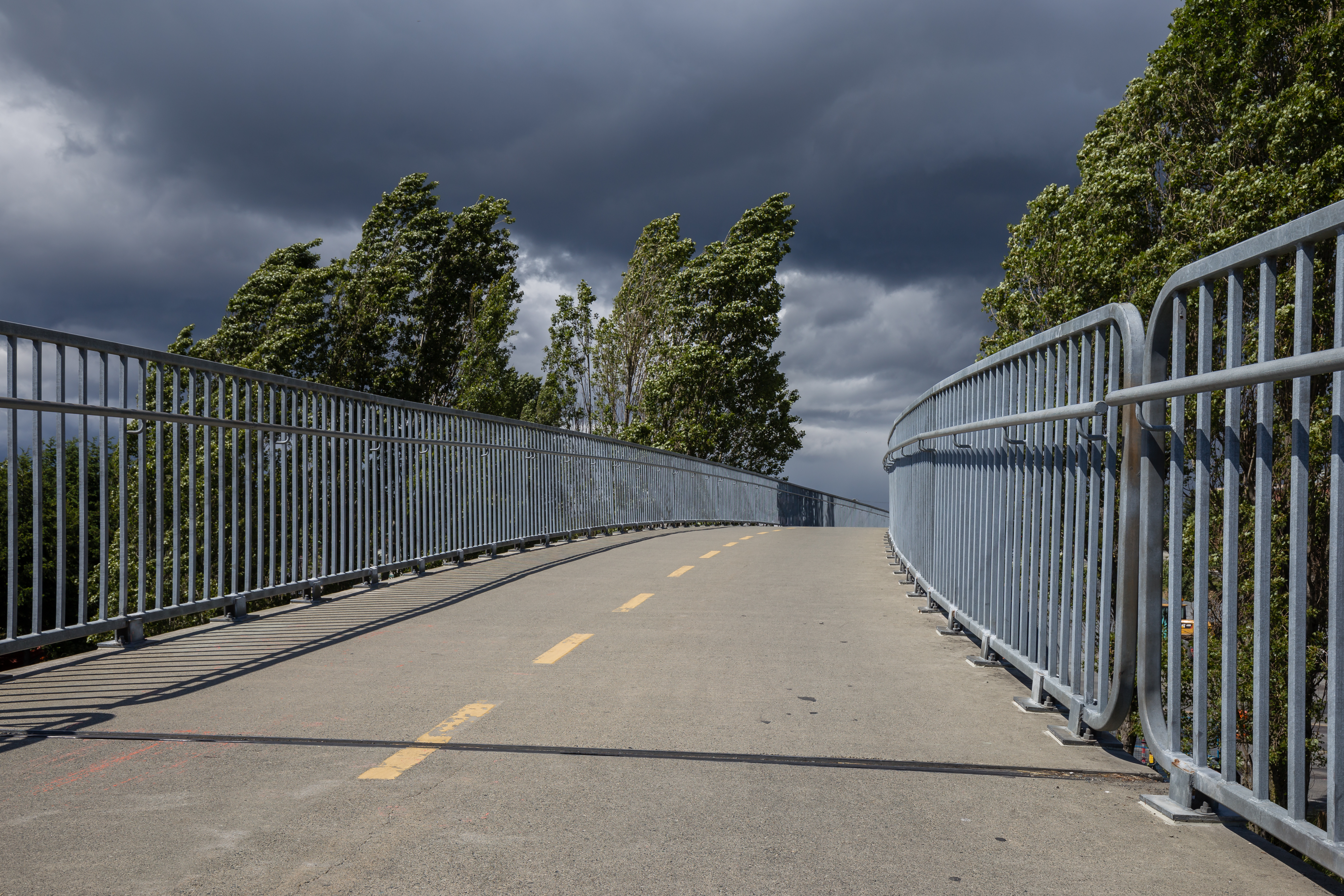
Switch Bridge area

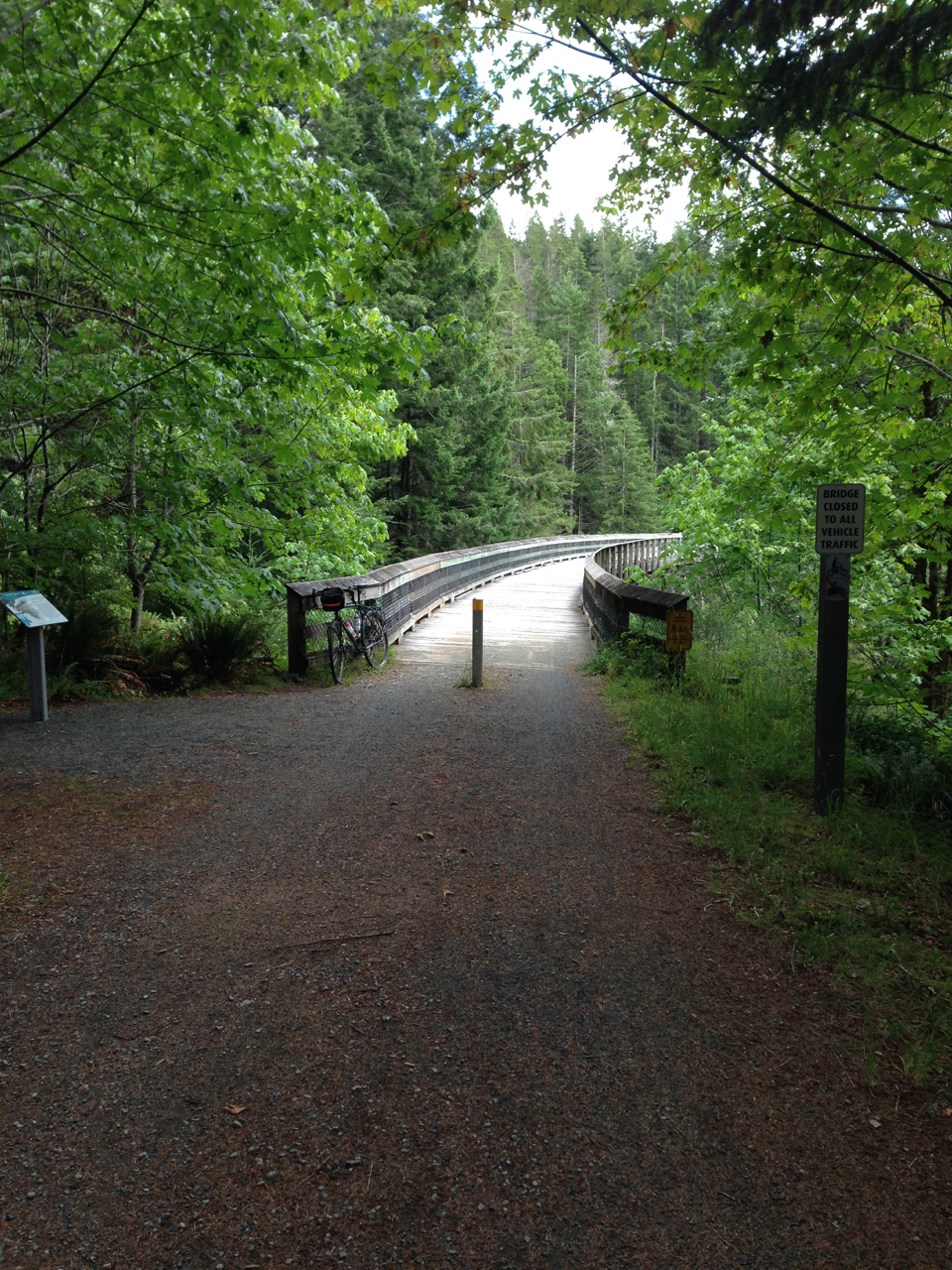
Charters Creek Trestle

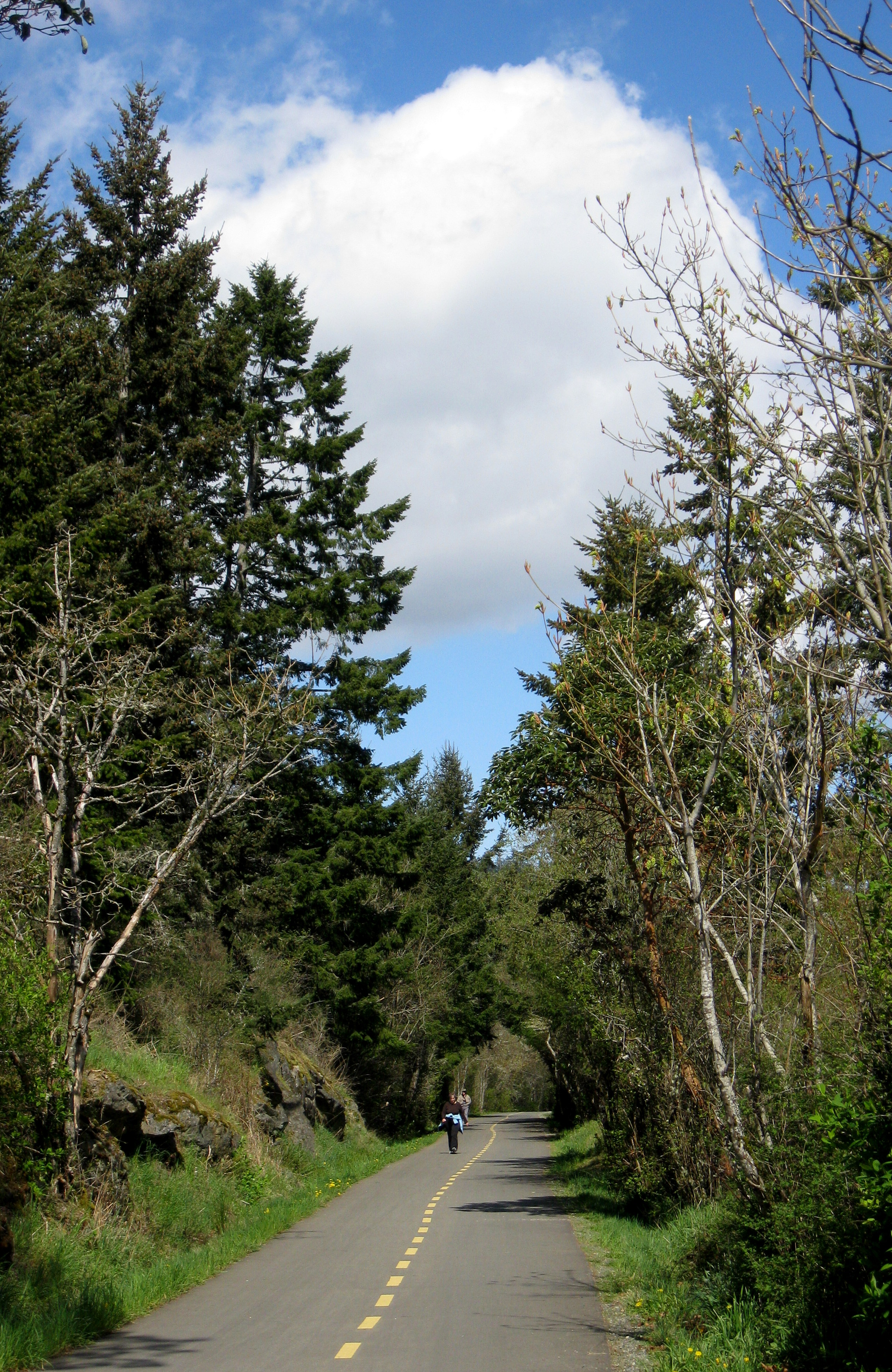
Biking

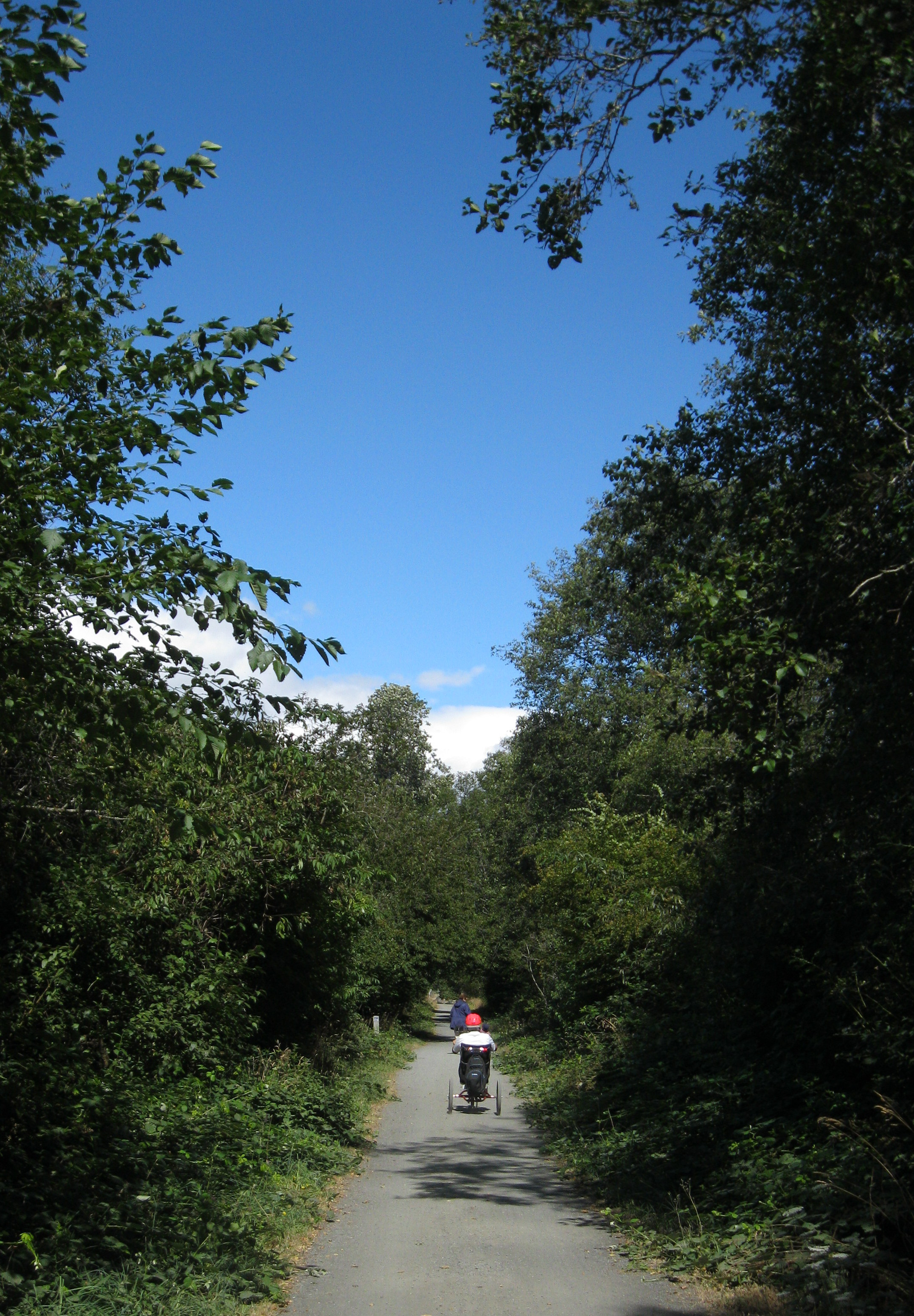

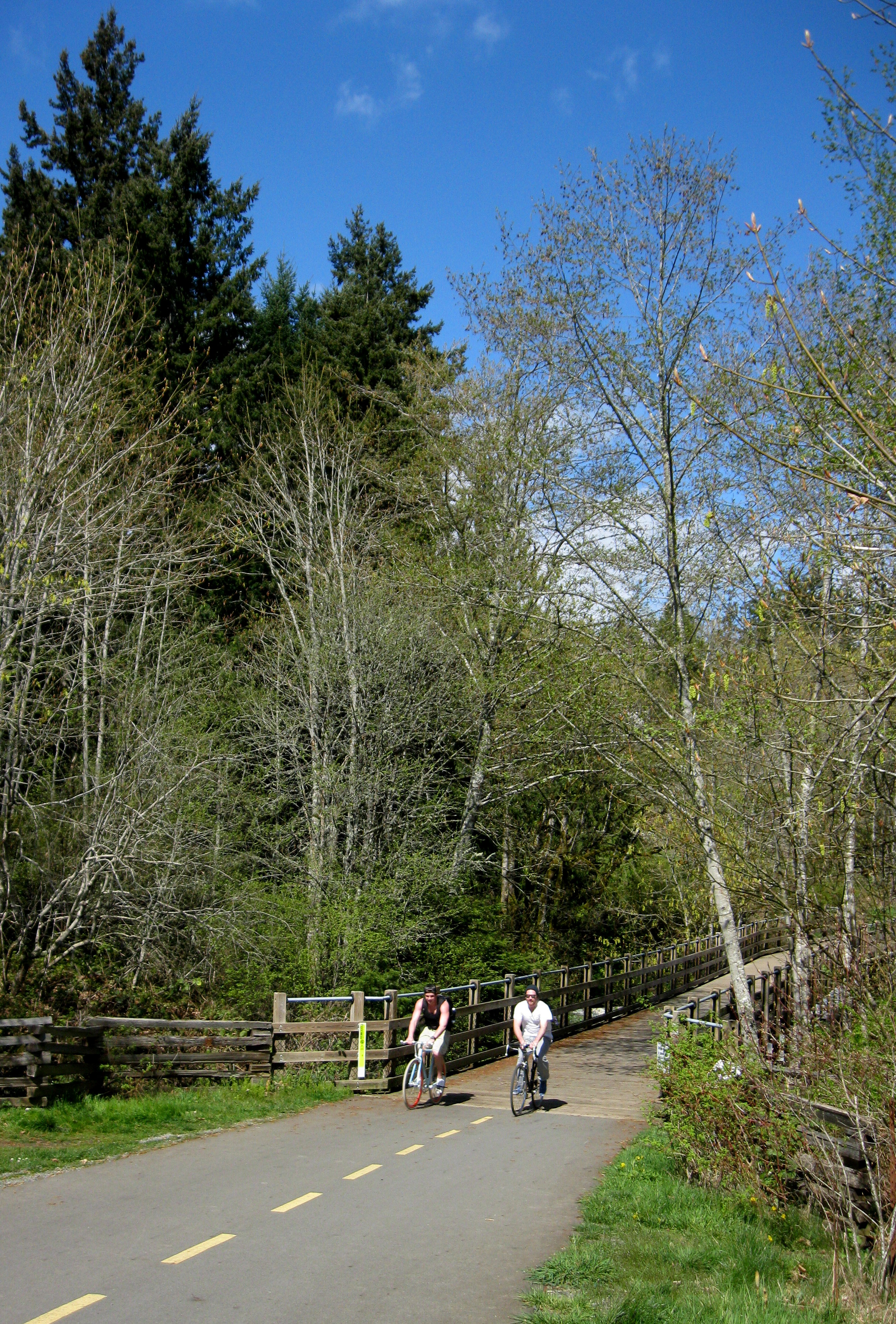
Cyclist trail

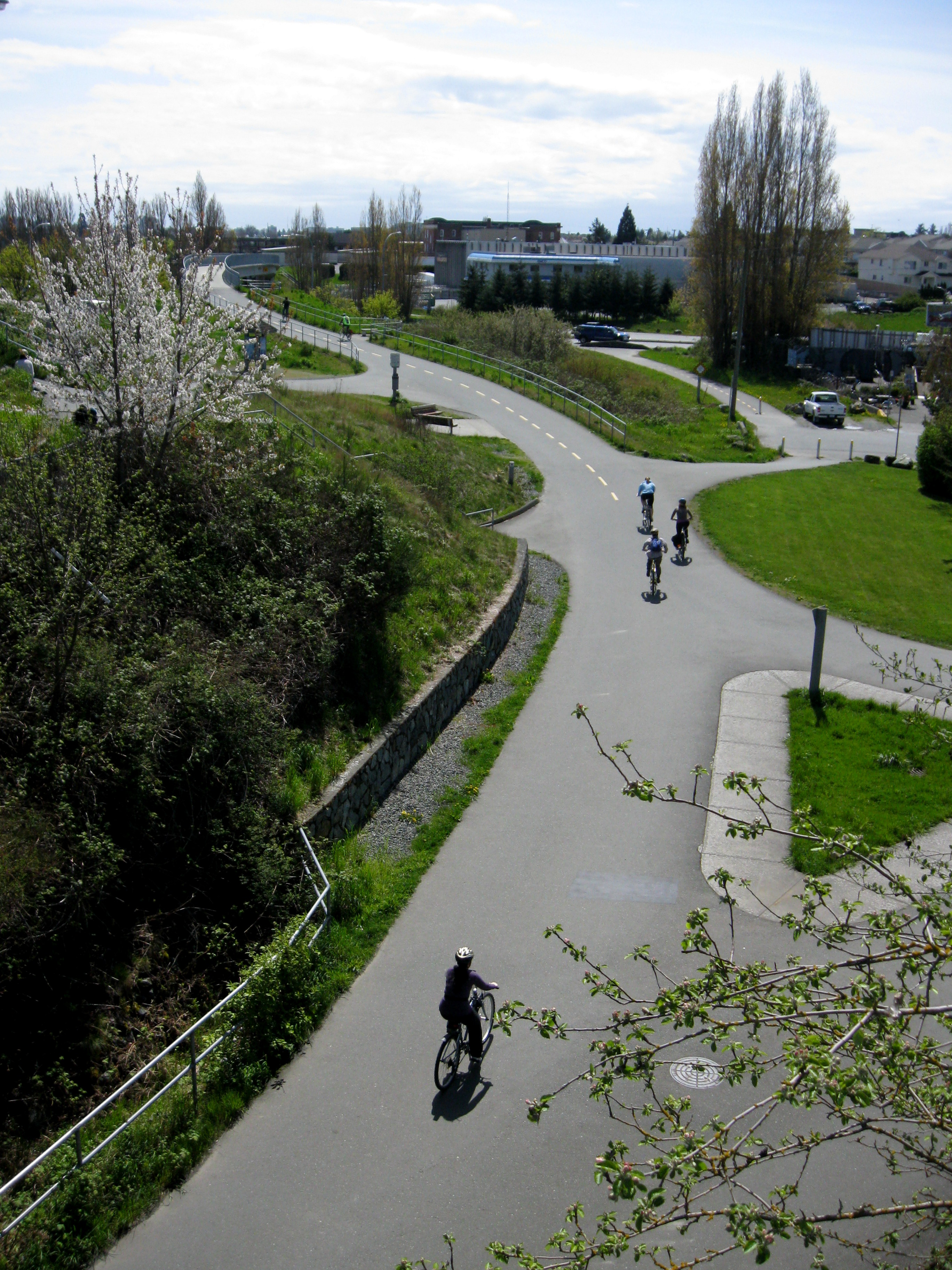
Switch Bridge area

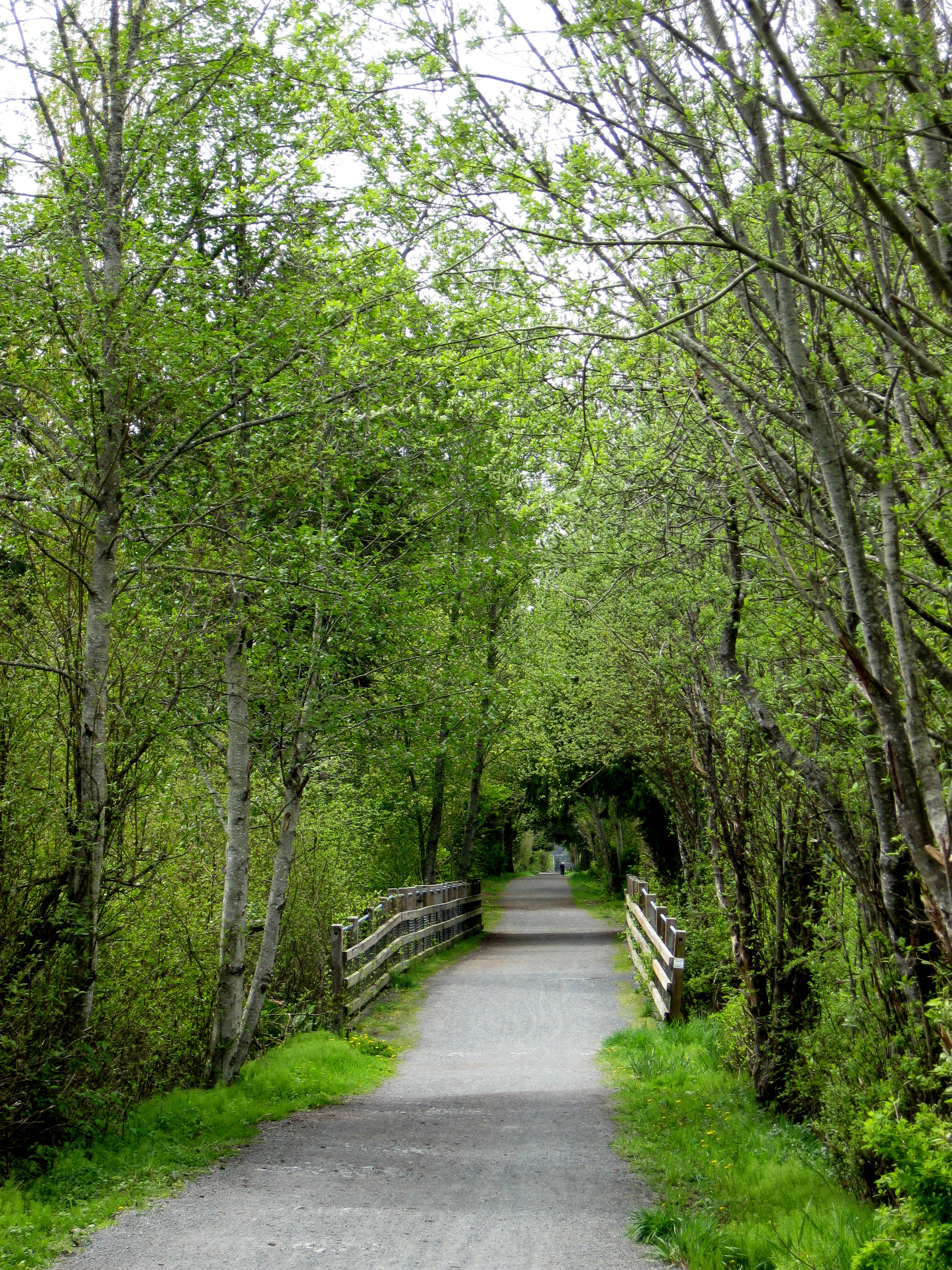
Glen Lake Area

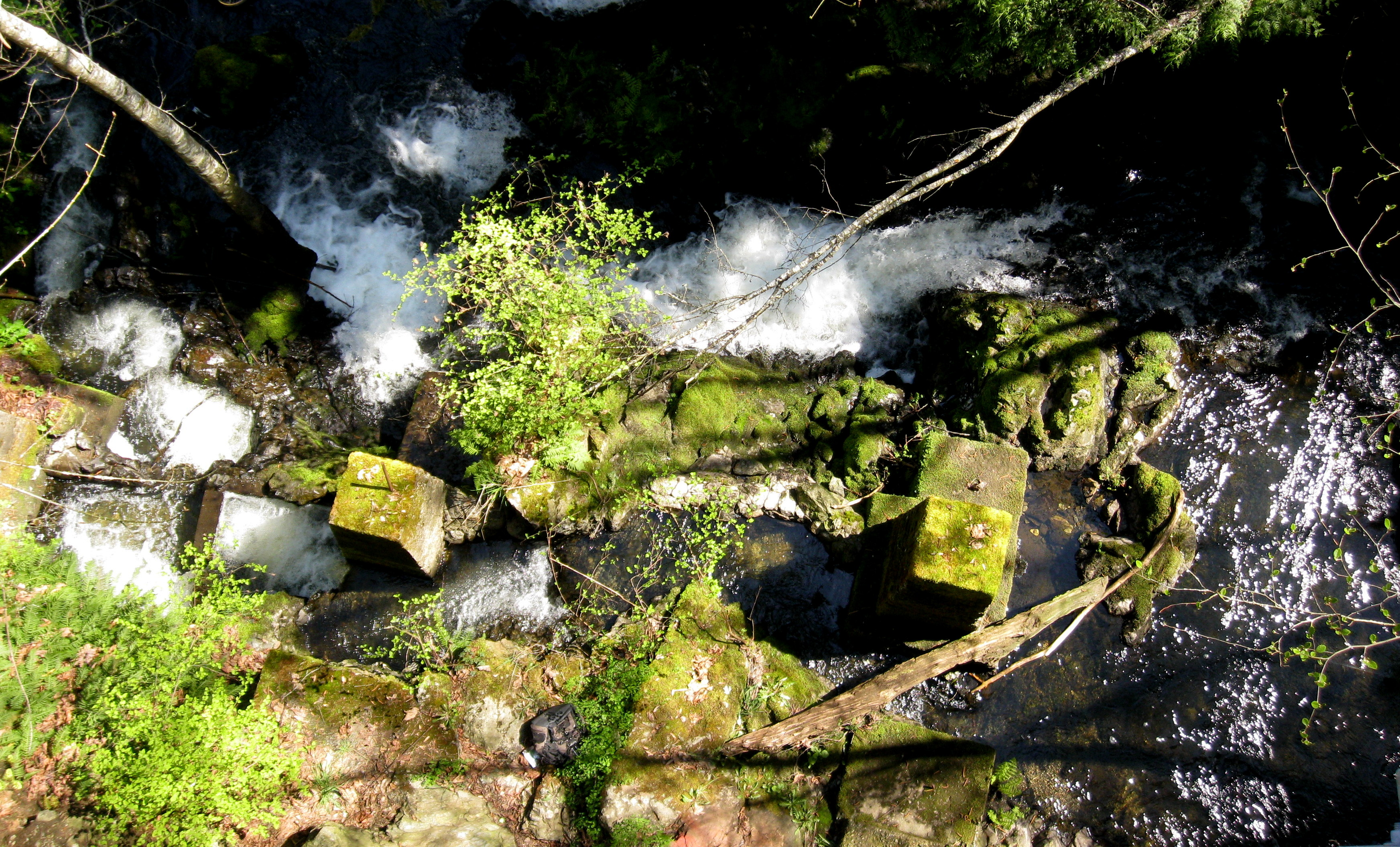
Millstream Creek Area
