= Port Mann =

Town in British Columbia, Canada

Coordinates: 49°12′36″N 122°49′30″W

Port Mann Townsite Plan as depicted in 2010 on BC Land Cadastre.

Port Mann townsite was created in 1911 in the municipality of Surrey, British Columbia. The new town was to adjoin the new railway yard and roundhouse forming the terminus of the new trans-national rail-line operated by Canadian Northern Railway. It was named for Donald Mann, a partner in the building of the Canadian Northern Railway. Newspaper quoted that the town was intended to be a model town. Purchase of sections had been completed by 1911 and clearing of the forest had begun. The sale of lots began in March 1912 and by June 1912 all land in the townsite had been sold. Four million dollars' worth of land was sold in Port Mann. Borrowing from mid-nineteenth century notions of Baron Haussmann’s Paris, Port Mann was laid out by landscape architect Frederick S. Todd with streets radiating from a central circus in the residential section. The business sector was to cluster around a large open square. In June 1912 the Toronto World also published that Port Mann would be the site of a large scale steel mill by Carnegie Steel Company of Pittsburgh as well as the site of flour mill, and grain elevators by International Milling, and the site of a large dry dock and shipbuilding yards.

== Failure of the port ==
Neither the model town of Port Mann nor the extensive industrial investment was ever fully realized. Immigration to Canada dropped sharply in 1913. The population of Vancouver declined from 120,000 in 1912 to 75,000 in 1916. Building permits in Vancouver dropped from a high of $20 million in 1911 to less than $2 million in 1914. Building permits would only reach $20 million again in 1929. The railway never terminated in Port Mann; instead the Canadian Northern Railway negotiated running rights with Great Northern across Fraser Railway Bridge to Vancouver to terminate at what is today Pacific Central Station. Soon after the sale of land at Port Mann, Canadian Northern Railway was involved in a similar development near Montreal where the Town of Mount Royal was created in 1912 and construction was started on the Mount Royal Tunnel on July 8, 1912. On November 5, 1916, due to inability to pay its debt obligations, the Government of Canada acquired 510,000 shares of 600,000 to take ownership of Canadian Northern Railway. From December 20, 1918, Canadian Northern Railway, in combination with the Canadian Government Railways, was officially referred to as Canadian National Railways.

== Geography ==
The area of the townsite encompassed an area from what is today 130th Street to 152nd street and from the Fraser Foreshore to 108 Avenue.
