= East Sooke =

Hamlet of East Sooke
- Hamlet
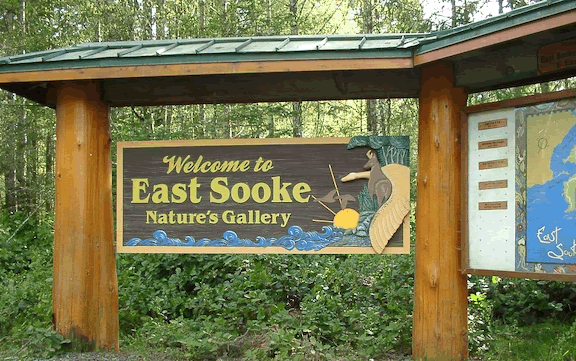
- Welcome sign
- Motto: Nature's Gallery
- Location of East Sooke on Vancouver Island
- Coordinates: 48°22′0″N 123°42′24″W
- Country: Canada
- Province: British Columbia
- Region: Vancouver Island
- Regional district: Capital Regional District

Government
  - Governing body: Capital Regional District

Population (2011)
  - Total: 1,435
- Time zone: UTC−07:00 (Pacific Time)
- Postal code span: V9Z 1B4
- Waterways: Strait of Juan de Fuca, Sooke Harbour, Sooke Basin
- Website: East Sooke

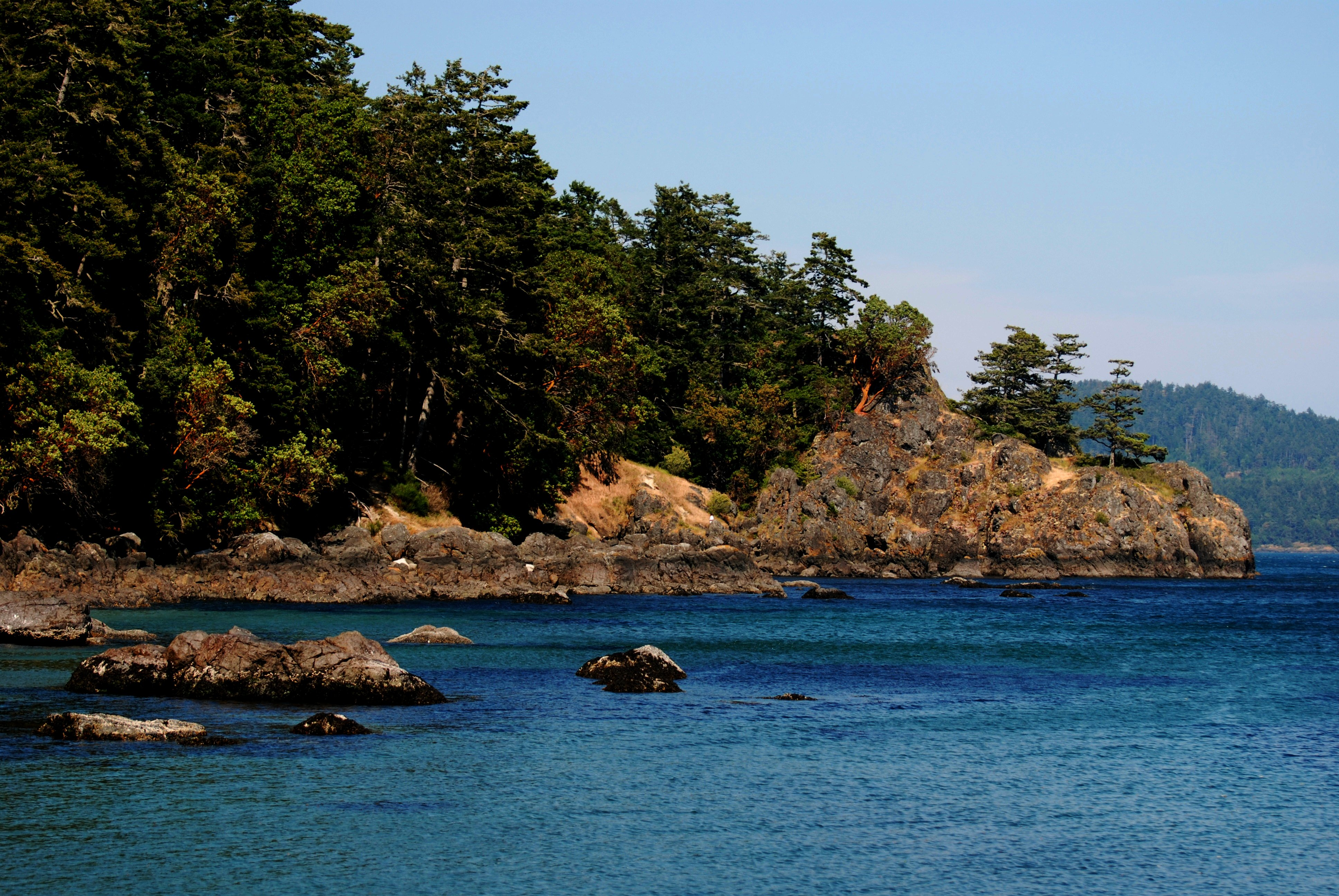
East Sooke Regional Park

East Sooke is an unincorporated community south and east of Sooke, British Columbia, Canada. It consists of over 500 houses (and one volunteer fire department), along with the headquarters of the Royal Canadian Marine Search and Rescue (RCMSAR) organization on the south side of the Sooke Basin. East Sooke borders on East Sooke Regional Park, an area of 14.3394 square kilometres (3,543.3 acres), with views south to Olympic National Park in the United States.

East Sooke does not have a town council. Instead it is governed by a regional director who is also responsible for other unincorporated areas in the Capital Regional District (the regional district of Greater Victoria).

East Sooke's general character is rural, although it is a bedroom community of Victoria, British Columbia. Its close proximity to Victoria, its character as a bedroom community, and its large tracts of undeveloped land have made it an attractive location for recreation and retirement developments. Political scuffles over the development of the community have led to two large sections of East Sooke splitting off and joining Sooke.

The population of East Sooke is roughly 1,500 (2001 census: 1434). There is no town core, but there is a single convenience store. East Sooke is a mix of small residential subdivisions, small hobby farms, and wilderness.

There are currently no schools in East Sooke, although there have been plans for an elementary school for a number of years. Some children are bussed to Sooke schools. This community is part of School District 62 Sooke. Some families in East Sooke homeschool their kids, negating the need to travel to Sooke for school.

== Neighbourhoods of East Sooke ==
(in order from east to west)

- Becher Bay
- Seedtree
- Mount Matheson
- Park Heights
- Anderson Cove
- Coppermine
- Seagirt
- Eliza Point
- Tideview

== Neighbouring communities ==
- Sooke
- Sci'anew Nation
- Metchosin

== See also ==
- Mount Matheson
