= Sooke =

District municipality in British Columbia, Canada

- District municipality
- District of Sooke
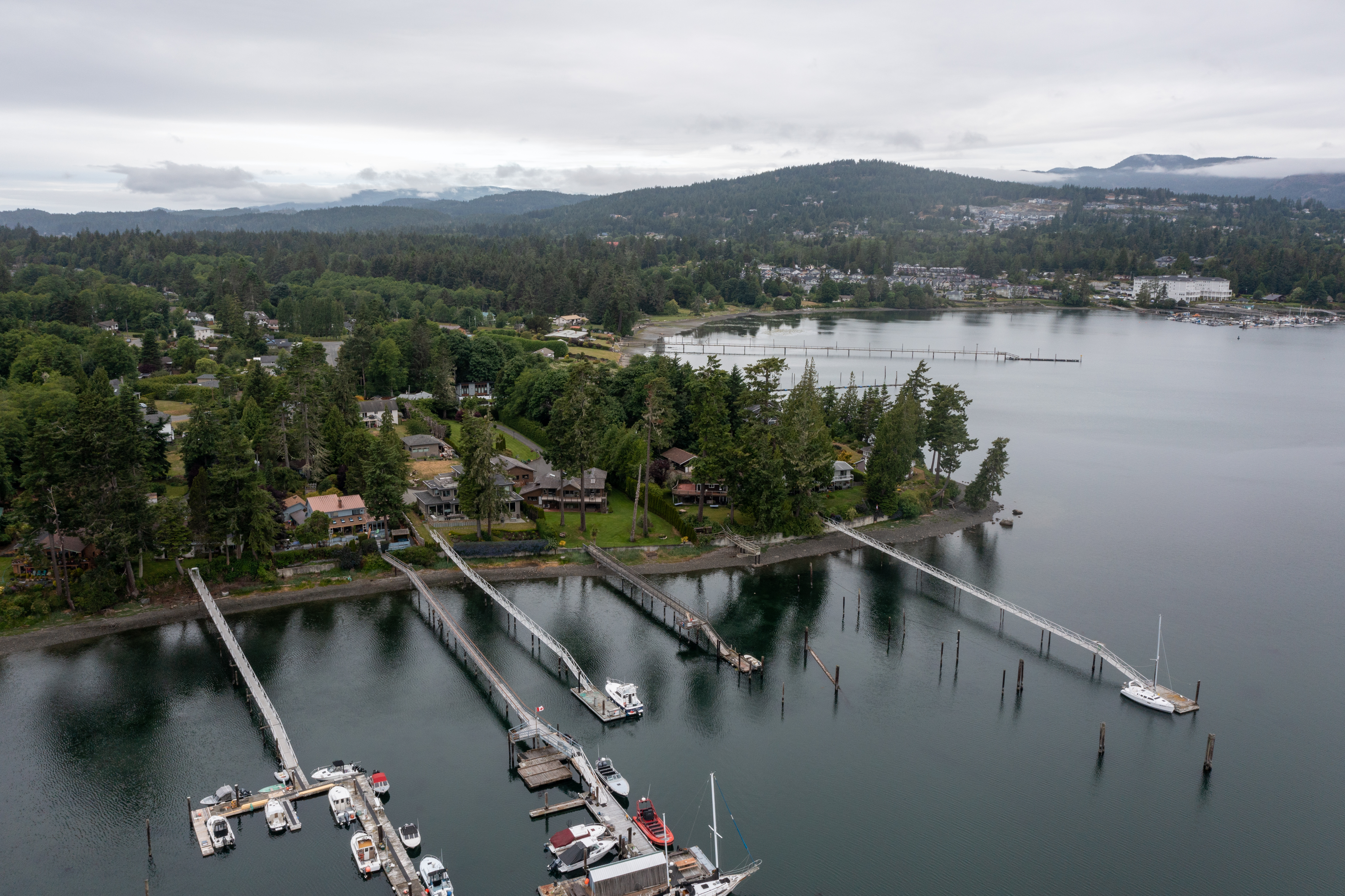

- Sooke (Capital Regional District) Location of Sooke within the Capital Regional District

- Location of Sooke within British Columbia Sooke (British Columbia)
- Coordinates: 48°22′34″N 123°44′16″W
- Country: Canada
- Province: British Columbia
- Regional district: Capital
- Incorporated: December 7, 1999

Government
  - Mayor: Maja Tait
  - Councillors: Jeff Bateman, Al Beddows, Megan McMath, Kevin Pearson, Tony St-Pierre.
  - MP: Stephanie McLean (L)
  - MLA: Dana Lajeunesse (NDP)

Area
  - Land: 56.60 km^{2} (21.85 sq mi)
- Elevation: 50 m (160 ft)

Population (2021)
  - Total: 15,086
  - Density: 266.6/km^{2} (690/sq mi)
- Time zone: UTC−07:00 (PT)
- Forward sortation area: V9Z
- Highways: 14
- Website: sooke.ca

Sooke (/ˈsuːk/) is a district municipality on the southern tip of Vancouver Island, Canada, 38 kilometres (24 mi) by road from Victoria, the capital of British Columbia. Sooke, the westernmost of Greater Victoria's Western Communities, is to the north and west of the Sooke Basin. It is a regional centre for residents in neighbouring communities, including Otter Point, Shirley and Jordan River.

== Geography ==
=== Climate ===
Sooke has a Mediterranean climate, with warm summers and mild winters, defined by the Köppen climate classification as Csb. Although its precipitation is more like dry summer climates, its temperatures resemble oceanic climates as found in Ireland, for example.

Climate data for Sooke (Park-Isle Marine), elevation: 32 m or 105 ft, 1967-1990 normals and extremes
Month	Jan	Feb	Mar	Apr	May	Jun	Jul	Aug	Sep	Oct	Nov	Dec	Year
Record high °C (°F)	15.1 (59.2)	15.6 (60.1)	16.0 (60.8)	23.6 (74.5)	28.2 (82.8)	28.3 (82.9)	29.4 (84.9)	29.6 (85.3)	27.2 (81.0)	21.5 (70.7)	21.8 (71.2)	15.9 (60.6)	29.6 (85.3)
Mean daily maximum °C (°F)	6.7 (44.1)	8.4 (47.1)	10.1 (50.2)	11.9 (53.4)	14.2 (57.6)	16.4 (61.5)	18.2 (64.8)	18.6 (65.5)	17.1 (62.8)	13.1 (55.6)	9.3 (48.7)	6.9 (44.4)	12.6 (54.6)
Daily mean °C (°F)	4.2 (39.6)	5.4 (41.7)	6.6 (43.9)	8.1 (46.6)	10.5 (50.9)	12.6 (54.7)	14.0 (57.2)	14.3 (57.7)	13.0 (55.4)	9.7 (49.5)	6.6 (43.9)	4.5 (40.1)	9.1 (48.4)
Mean daily minimum °C (°F)	1.6 (34.9)	2.4 (36.3)	3.0 (37.4)	4.3 (39.7)	6.7 (44.1)	8.8 (47.8)	9.9 (49.8)	10.1 (50.2)	8.8 (47.8)	6.2 (43.2)	3.8 (38.8)	2.0 (35.6)	5.6 (42.1)
Record low °C (°F)	−10.6 (12.9)	−12.5 (9.5)	−6.2 (20.8)	−2.2 (28.0)	0.0 (32.0)	3.3 (37.9)	5.0 (41.0)	4.4 (39.9)	1.7 (35.1)	−2.8 (27.0)	−10.8 (12.6)	−13.9 (7.0)	−13.9 (7.0)
Average precipitation mm (inches)	193.1 (7.60)	142.2 (5.60)	108.8 (4.28)	75.6 (2.98)	44.7 (1.76)	28.6 (1.13)	21.0 (0.83)	26.5 (1.04)	54.8 (2.16)	121.3 (4.78)	213.0 (8.39)	197.2 (7.76)	1,226.8 (48.31)
Average rainfall mm (inches)	181.5 (7.15)	138.4 (5.45)	107.2 (4.22)	75.2 (2.96)	44.7 (1.76)	28.6 (1.13)	21.0 (0.83)	26.5 (1.04)	54.8 (2.16)	121.3 (4.78)	209.4 (8.24)	189.0 (7.44)	1,197.6 (47.16)
Average snowfall cm (inches)	11.7 (4.6)	3.9 (1.5)	1.6 (0.6)	0.4 (0.2)	0.0 (0.0)	0.0 (0.0)	0.0 (0.0)	0.0 (0.0)	0.0 (0.0)	0.0 (0.0)	3.4 (1.3)	8.2 (3.2)	29.2 (11.4)
Average precipitation days (≥ 0.2 mm)	20	17	17	15	12	9	5	6	10	15	21	21	168
Average rainy days (≥ 0.2 mm)	18	16	17	15	12	9	5	6	10	15	20	20	163
Average snowy days (≥ 0.2 cm)	3	1	trace	trace	trace	0	0	0	0	0	trace	2	6
Average relative humidity (%)	84	83	81	—	—	82	83	—	—	87	86	85	83
Source: NOAA

== Demographics ==
In the 2021 Census of Population conducted by Statistics Canada, Sooke had a population of 15,086 living in 6,129 of its 6,431 total private dwellings, an increase of 16% from its 2016 population of 13,001. With a land area of 56.6 km^{2} (21.9 sq mi), it had a population density of 266.5/km^{2} (690.3/sq mi) in 2021.

Historical census populations – Sooke
Year	Pop.	±%
2001	8,735	—
2006	9,704	+11.1%
2011	11,485	+18.4%
2016	13,001	+13.2%
2021	15,086	+16.0%
Population counts are not adjusted for boundary changes. Source: Statistics Canada

=== Ethnicity ===
Panethnic groups in the District of Sooke (2001−2021)
Panethnic group	2021		2016		2011		2006		2001	
Panethnic group	Pop.	%	Pop.	%	Pop.	%	Pop.	%	Pop.	%
European (Note: Statistic includes all persons that did not make up part of a visible minority or an indigenous identity.)	13,135	87.71%	11,565	89.69%	10,380	91.41%	8,850	91.33%	8,170	93.75%
Indigenous	1,065	7.11%	865	6.71%	655	5.77%	390	4.02%	315	3.61%
East Asian (Note: Statistic includes total responses of "Chinese", "Korean", and "Japanese" under visible minority section on census.)	215	1.44%	190	1.47%	75	0.66%	120	1.24%	85	0.98%
Southeast Asian (Note: Statistic includes total responses of "Filipino" and "Southeast Asian" under visible minority section on census.)	190	1.27%	100	0.78%	55	0.48%	50	0.52%	50	0.57%
Latin American	90	0.6%	20	0.16%	40	0.35%	20	0.21%	40	0.46%
South Asian	85	0.57%	65	0.5%	70	0.62%	120	1.24%	15	0.17%
African	85	0.57%	35	0.27%	80	0.7%	80	0.83%	30	0.34%
Middle Eastern (Note: Statistic includes total responses of "West Asian" and "Arab" under visible minority section on census.)	25	0.17%	10	0.08%	0	0%	20	0.21%	10	0.11%
Other/multiracial (Note: Statistic includes total responses of "Visible minority, n.i.e." and "Multiple visible minorities" under visible minority section on census.)	75	0.5%	45	0.35%	0	0%	45	0.46%	10	0.11%
Total responses	14,975	99.26%	12,895	99.18%	11,355	99.3%	9,690	99.86%	8,715	99.77%
Total population	15,086	100%	13,001	100%	11,435	100%	9,704	100%	8,735	100%
Note: Totals greater than 100% due to multiple origin responses.

=== Religion ===
According to the 2021 census, religious groups in Sooke included:

- No religion or secular perspectives: 9,825 persons
- Christianity: 4,755 persons
- Judaism: 70 persons
- Buddhism: 504 persons
- Islam: 10 persons
- Muslim: 50 persons
- Indigenous Spirituality: 20 persons
- Hinduism: 10 persons
- Sikhism: 10 persons

== Governance ==
The District of Sooke was incorporated as a municipality on December 7, 1999. It is one of 13 municipalities within the Capital Regional District and is located in the traditional territories of the T'Sou-ke and Scia'new First Nations.

=== Municipal ===
Sooke is governed by a mayor and six councillors, who are elected every four years. The current council was elected on October 15, 2022.

- Mayor: Maja Tait
- Councilor:
  - Jeff Bateman
  - Al Beddows
  - Herb Haldane
  - Megan McMath
  - Kevin Pearson
  - Tony St-Pierre

Dana Lajeunesse, who had served on council since replacing the late Brenda Parkinson following a September, 2019 by-election, was elected to the Legislative Assembly of British Columbia in the 2024 British Columbia general election. His successor on Sooke council, Herb Haldane, was elected in a by-election on July 12, 2025.

=== Federal ===
Federally the District is in the riding of Esquimalt-Saanich-Sooke, represented by Stephanie McLean (Liberal) since April 28, 2025.

Sooke federal election results
Year	Liberal		Conservative		New Democratic		Green	
2021	17%	1,256	26%	1,919	42%	3,124	7%	542
2019	15%	1,089	24%	1,728	37%	2,691	21%	1,530

=== Provincial ===
Sooke was part of the riding of Langford-Juan de Fuca, represented by the BC NDP's Ravi Parmar. He succeeded John Horgan, the former Premier of British Columbia (2017–2022) who first won the seat in 2009 and retired from politics for health reasons in 2023.

In April 2023, the BC Electoral Boundaries Commission created the new riding of Juan de Fuca-Malahat. It encompasses 44,980 people in Sooke, Port Renfrew, Jordan River, Otter Point, East Sooke, Metchosin, Malahat, Mill Bay and Shawnigan Lake. Its first elected representative, Dana Lajeunesse, won election in a tight race in October, 2024 following a recount.

Sooke provincial election results
Year	New Democratic		Liberal		Green	
2020	70%	3,282	13%	623	17%	789
2017	54%	2,745	25%	1,263	18%	931
			Conservative			
2024	39%	9,308	38%	9,167	23%	5,522

== Tourism and recreation ==
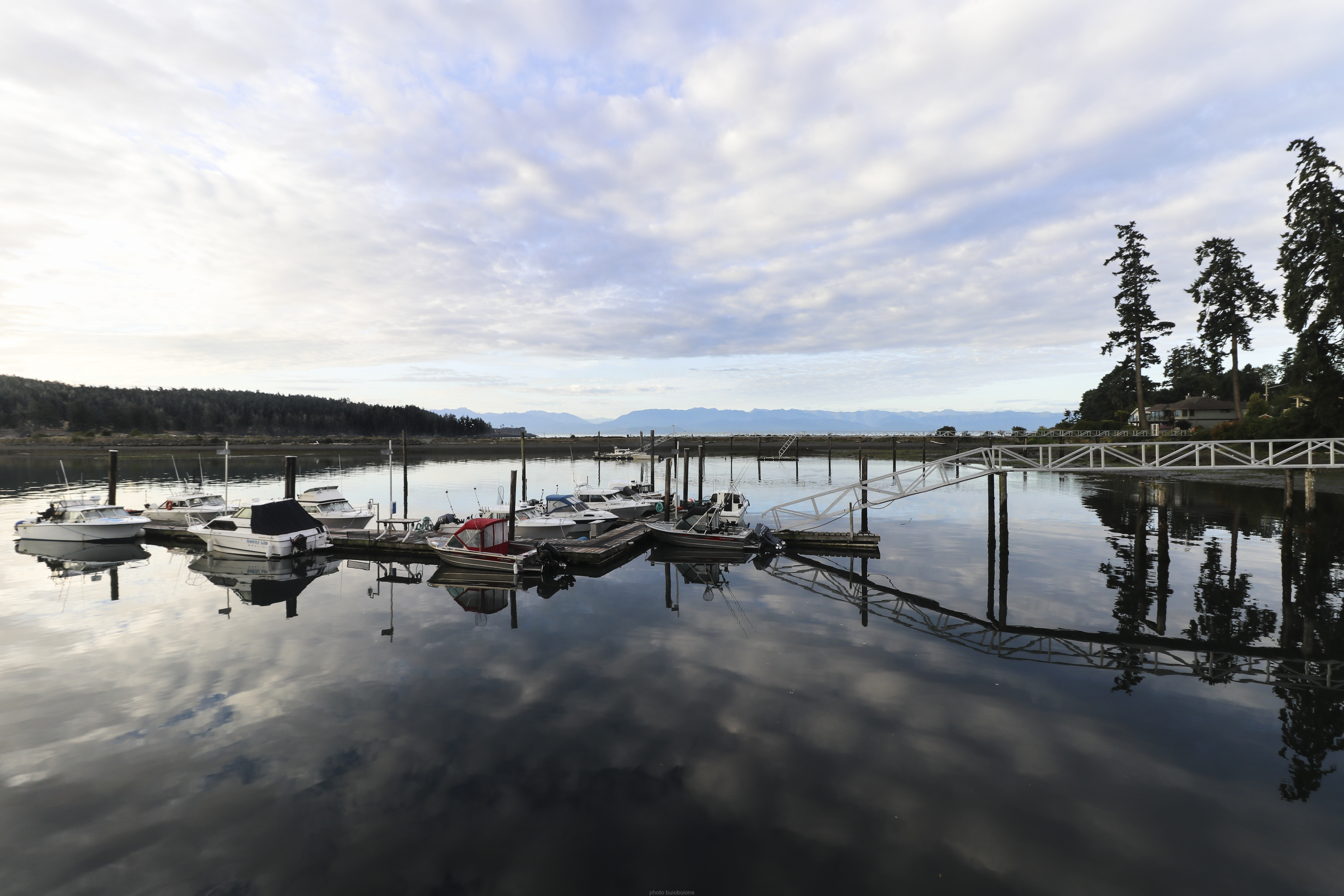
Sooke Harbour

Well-known destinations in Sooke include Whiffin Spit Park, the Sooke Potholes Regional Park and adjacent Sooke Potholes Provincial Park.

Sooke is home to the Sooke Region Museum.

The area is the base for visiting the wilderness parks of Vancouver Island's southwest coast — the West Coast Trail and the Juan de Fuca Provincial Park, which includes the Juan de Fuca Marine Trail. Beaches near Sooke include Sandcut, French Beach, Fishboat Bay, China Beach, and Mystic Beach.

The Galloping Goose Regional Trail, part of the Trans-Canada Trail, runs through Sooke as far as Leechtown, the former site of a gold-rush town circa 1865. Once a rail line, the Goose is now a popular pedestrian and cycling route connecting Sooke to Victoria.

== Arts and culture ==
The Sooke Fall Fair was first held in 1913 and continues on Labour Day weekends annually at the Sooke Community Hall.

== Real estate ==
In April 2022, an average single-family home in Sooke costs $887,500 based on the home price index, drawing from data from the Victoria Real Estate Board (VREB). By June 2022, that number (directly from VREB) increased to $938,000. The average home value as of July 1, 2022 as determined by BC Assessment was $831,000.

== Education ==
Sooke is a part of the School District 62 Sooke. There is one high school, Edward Milne Community School, and one junior high school, Journey Middle School. The four elementary schools in the area are John Muir (in the town's west end), Sooke Elementary (town centre), the French immersion Ecole Poirier (town centre), and Saseenos Elementary (east end). In 2018, SD62 announced it had purchased land to build the future Sunriver Elementary in the Sunriver neighbourhood. Continuing adult education programs are offered by the Edward Milne Community School (EMCS) Society, which also operates with day, evening and weekend programs. The closest post-secondary institutions are Royal Roads University and Camosun College's Interurban campus. The non-profit Sooke Region Lifelong Learning offers a diverse set of educational programs and workshops both virtually and at the Sooke library.

== Notable residents ==
- Marilyn Bowering, Canadian poet, novelist and playwright, lives in the Sooke region.
- Rebecca Collard, journalist and broadcaster (CBC, BBC, New York Times, TIME, Rolling Stone), was raised in Sooke.
- Adam Dobres, guitarist, songwriter and touring member of The Wailin' Jennies and the Ruth Moody band, was born and raised in Sooke.
- Phoebe Dunbar, 2012 recipient of the Governor General of Canada Sovereign's Medal for Volunteers.
- Sara Fowler, 2015 recipient of the Governor General of Canada's Caring Canadian Award.
- Kingsley Jones, head coach of the Canadian men's national rugby team.
- Darrel J. McLeod, Governor General's Award-winning author, lives in the Sooke region.
- Wendy Morton, poet and 2017 recipient of the Order of British Columbia, lives in the Sooke region.
- Bryce Soderberg, bassist and vocalist for American rock band Lifehouse.
- Nicola Temple, co-author of Sorting the Beef from the Bull: The Science of Food Fraud Forensics, spent her teenage and young adult years in Sooke.
- J. Lee Thompson (1914–2002), British film producer and director (Cape Fear, The Guns of Navarone)
- Kevin Wenstob, Canadian logger and subject of the reality TV series Big Timber.
