= Sooke Potholes Provincial Park =

Provincial park on British Columbia, Canada

- IUCN category II (national park)
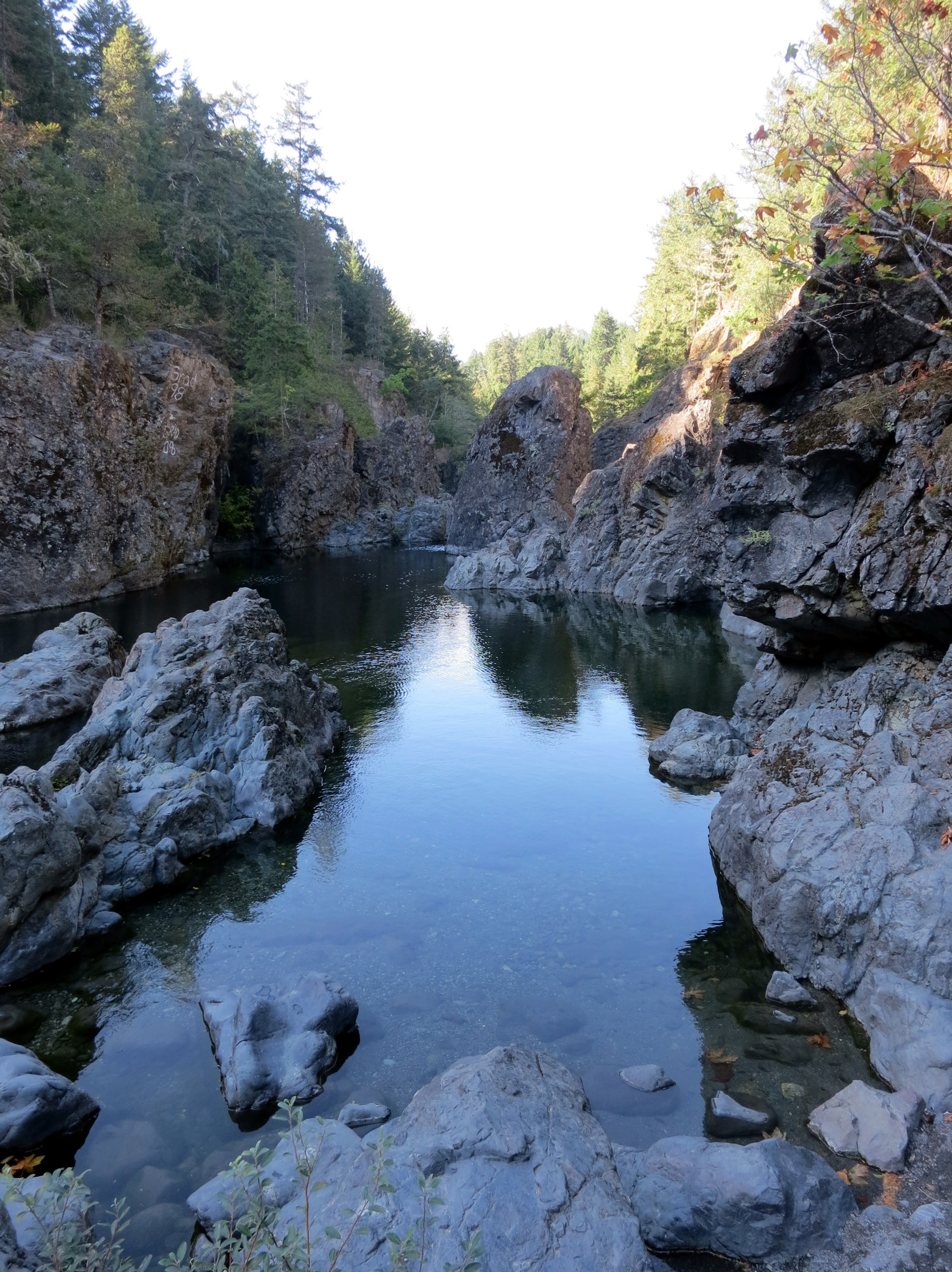

- Location within Vancouver Island Location within British Columbia
- Interactive map of Sooke Potholes Provincial Park
- Location: Capital Regional District, British Columbia, Canada
- Nearest city: Victoria, British Columbia, Canada
- Coordinates: 48.428°N 123.712°W
- Area: 7.28 ha (18.0 acres)
- Established: September 7, 1972

Sooke Potholes Provincial Park is a 7.28 hectare provincial park in British Columbia, Canada. It is adjacent to the Sooke River and Sooke Potholes Regional Park, near Victoria, British Columbia. Intended primarily to provide access to the Sooke River and the associated potholes, it also offers wildlife viewing and other day-use activities.

== Environment ==
Sooke Potholes Provincial Park, in the Leeward Island Mountains Ecosection, is primarily focused around a set of naturally occurring, water-carved potholes along the Sooke River. Although the river is a popular swimming spot, it is also an important spawning river for chinook and coho salmon and is a main wildlife corridor between the Sooke Hills and Capital Region greenbelts. Sierra wood fern and streambank lupine, both threatened species, are important plant species that can be found in the park, as well as old-growth Douglas firs. Park animal species include the black bear, cougar and the Roosevelt elk.

The abandoned Sooke Flowline aqueduct, constructed in 1915, snakes through the nearby hills around the Sooke Potholes and travels all the way to the Humpback Reservoir near Mt. Wells Regional Park. It runs north–south to the east of Sooke River.

== Activities and services ==
The park is primarily designed to provide access to the potholes and the Sooke River for swimming, picnicking, fishing, and other recreational activities along the river. Because the potholes are outside the park boundaries, the park is primarily designed to allow access through the park to the Sooke River, and does not have washrooms, trash bins, or other service facilities to allow anything other than day use. There are multiple trails and two parking lots to allow easy access to the potholes and the river.
