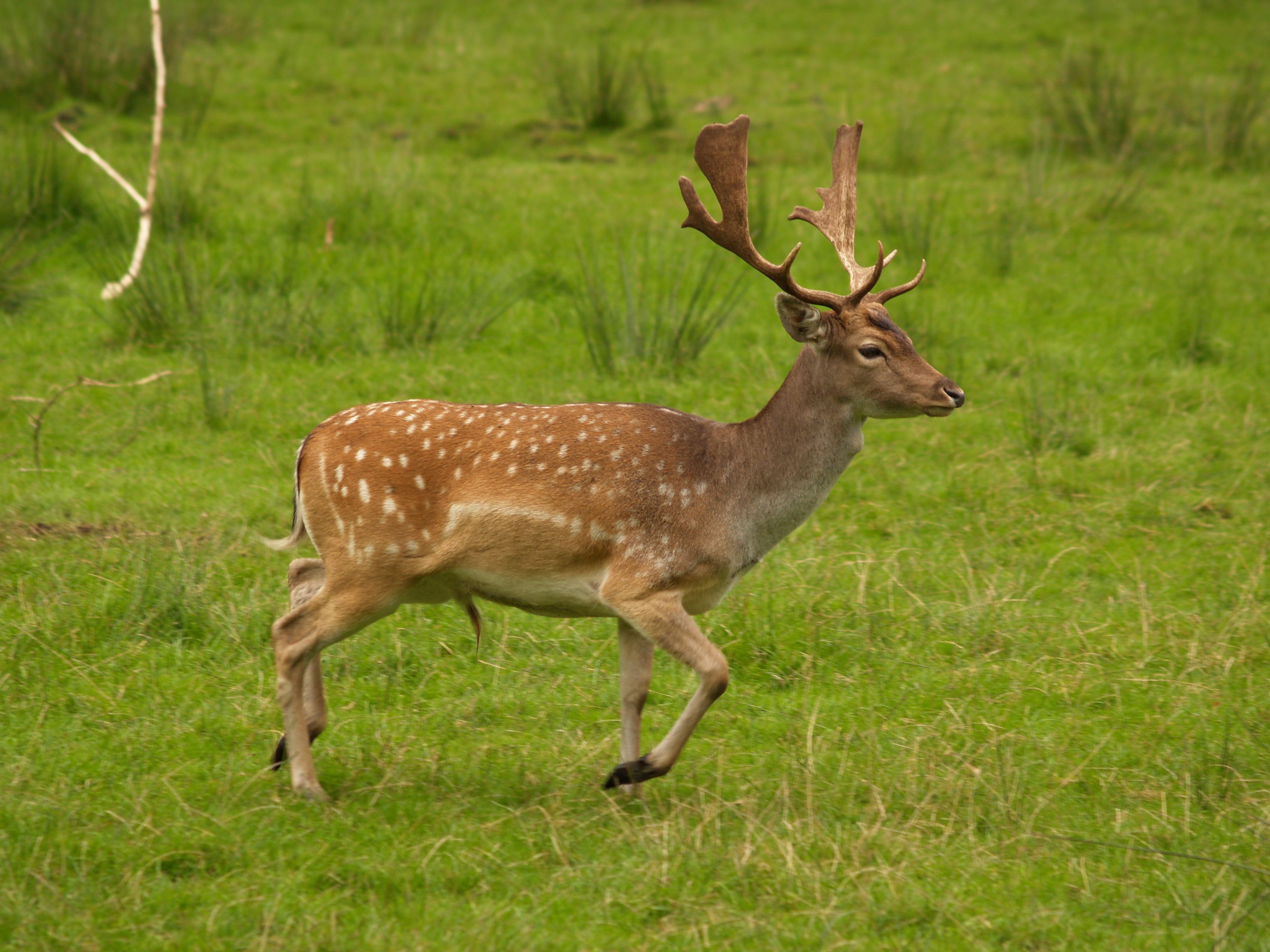
- Male (buck)
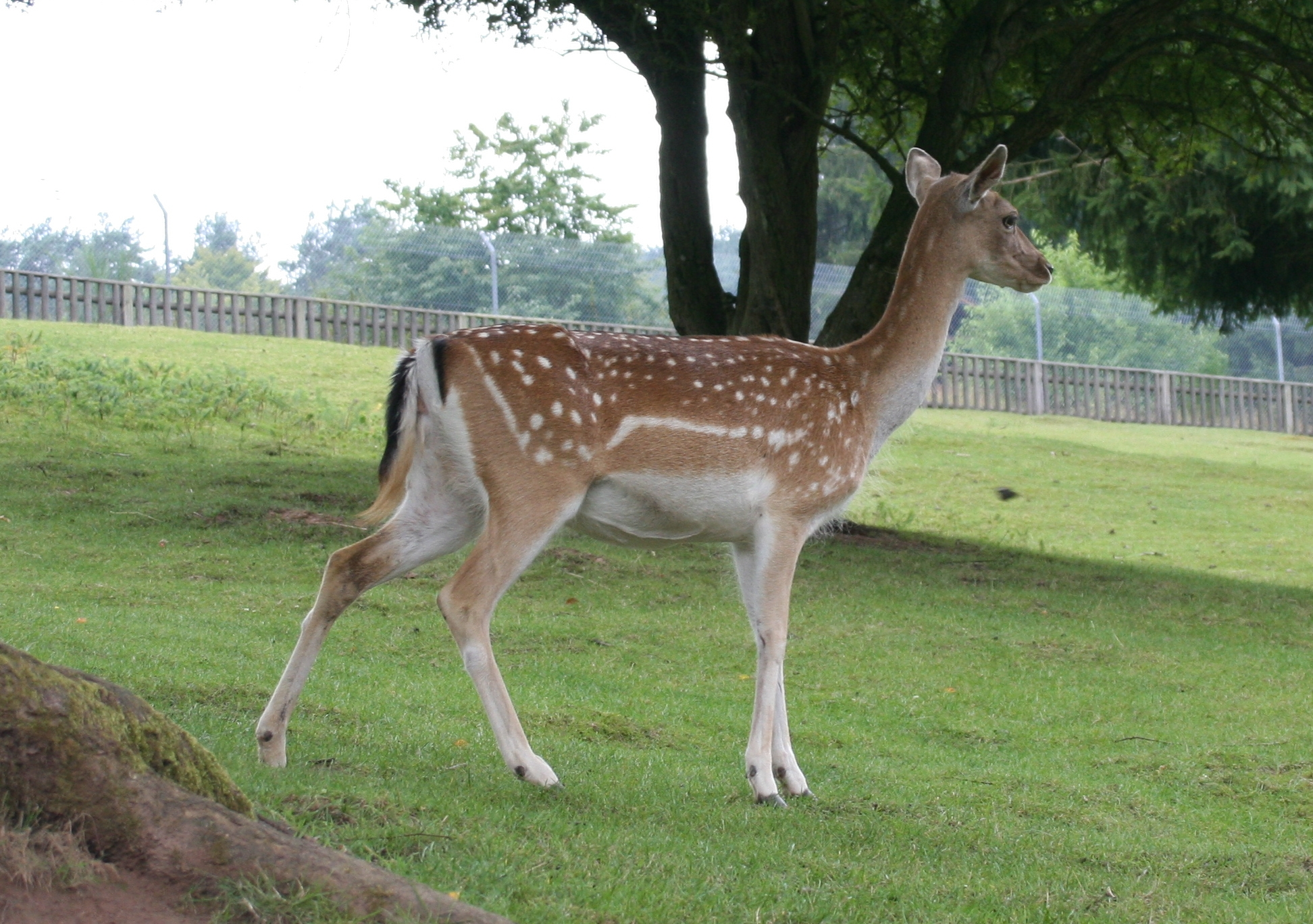
- Female (doe)

Conservation status
- Least Concern (IUCN 3.1)

Scientific classification
- Kingdom: Animalia
- Phylum: Chordata
- Class: Mammalia
- Order: Artiodactyla
- Family: Cervidae
- Genus: Dama
- Species: D. dama

Binomial name
- Dama dama (Linnaeus, 1758)
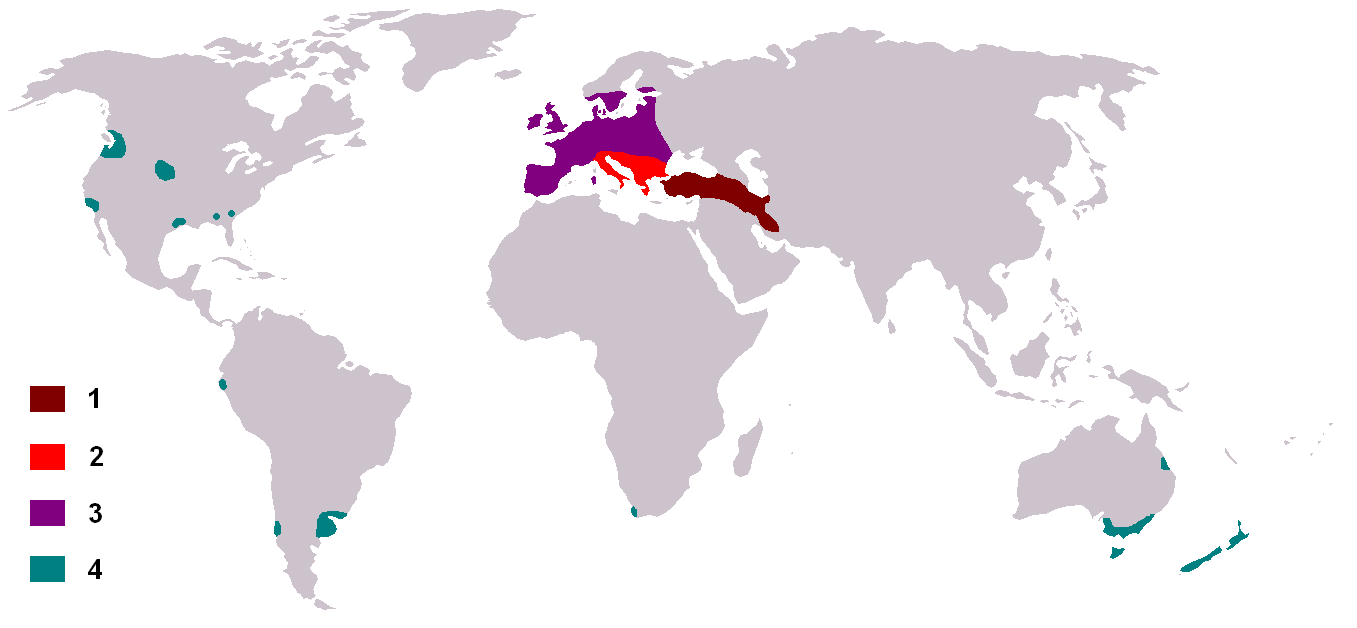
- Range: 1: (Former) native, includes D. mesopotamica 2: Possibly native 3: Early human introductions 4: Modern human introductions

Synonyms
- Cervus dama Linnaeus, 1758

Audio
- A male (buck) bellowing, UK, October 1964

= European fallow deer =

Species of hooved mammal

The European fallow deer (Dama dama), also known as the common fallow deer or simply fallow deer, is a species of deer native to Eurasia. It is one of two living species of fallow deer alongside the Persian fallow deer (Dama mesopotamica). It is historically native to Turkey and possibly the Italian Peninsula, Balkan Peninsula, and the island of Rhodes near Anatolia. During the Pleistocene it inhabited much of Europe, and has been reintroduced to its prehistoric distribution by humans. It has also been introduced to other regions in the world.

== Taxonomy ==
Some taxonomists include the rarer Persian fallow deer as a subspecies (D. d. mesopotamica), with both species being grouped together as the fallow deer, while others treat it as a different species (D. mesopotamica). The white-tailed deer (Odocoileus virginianus) was once classified as Dama virginiana and the mule deer or black-tailed deer (Odocoileus hemionus) as Dama hemionus; they were given a separate genus in the 19th century.

== Description ==
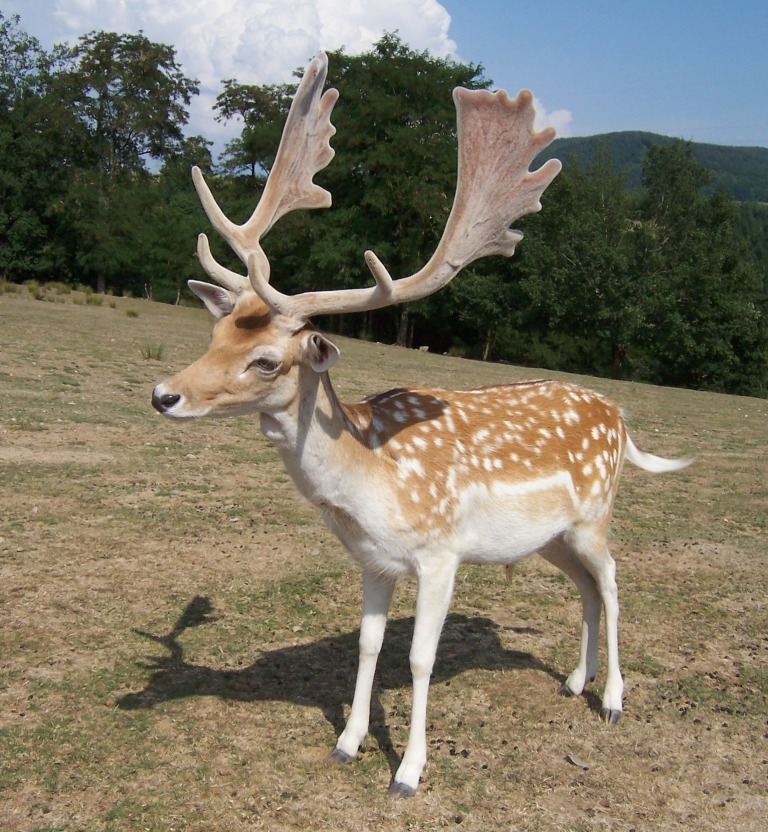
Male (buck)

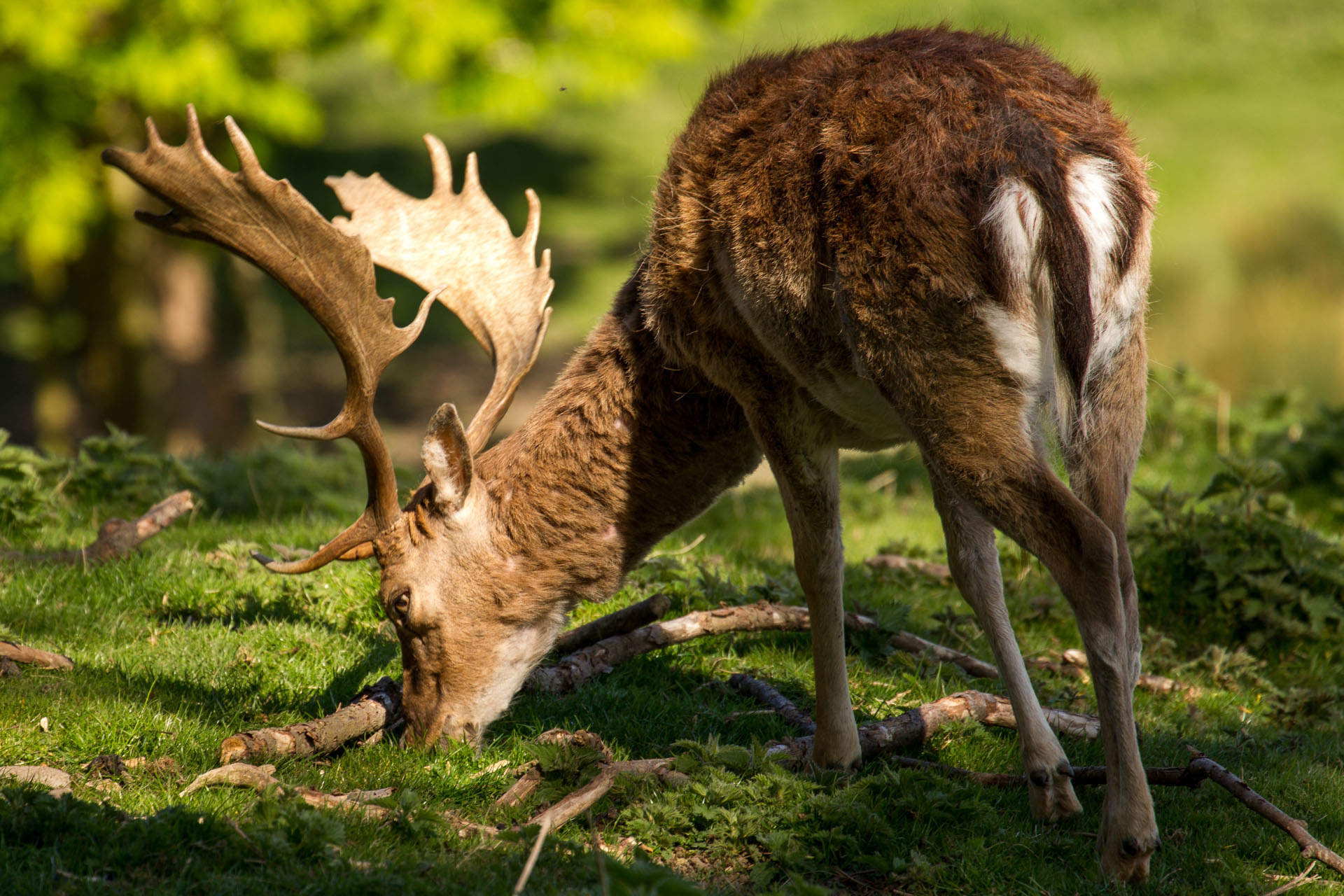
Mature buck showing common darker colouring of a winter coat with lighter area around the tail

The male fallow deer is known as a buck, the female is a doe, and the young a fawn. Globally, adult bucks are 140–160 cm (55–63 in) long, 85–95 cm (33–37 in) in shoulder height, and typically 60–100 kg (130–220 lb) in weight, while does are 130–150 cm (51–59 in) long, 75–85 cm (30–33 in) in shoulder height, and 30–50 kg (66–110 lb) in weight. However, regional variations occur; for example, bucks in southern England average 88.8 cm (35.0 in) in shoulder height and about 66.1 kg (146 lb) in weight, while does there average 80.7 cm (31.8 in) in height and about 45.2 kg (100 lb) in weight. Globally, the largest bucks may measure 190 cm (75 in) long and weigh 150 kg (330 lb). Fawns are born in spring around 30 cm (12 in) and weigh around 3–4 kg (6 1/2–9 lb). Their lifespan is around 12–16 years.

Much variation occurs in the coat colour of the species, with four main variants: common, menil, melanistic, and leucistic – not to be confused with the inherited genetic condition, albinism. Leucistic coats are the lightest in colour, almost white; common and menil are darker, and melanistic is very dark, sometimes even black (and may be confused with the sika deer).

- Common: Chestnut coat with white mottles, it is most pronounced in summer with a much darker, unspotted coat in the winter. The light-coloured area around the tail is edged with black. The tail is light with a black stripe.
- Menil: Spots are more distinct than common in summer and no black is seen around the rump patch or on the tail. In winter, spots are still clear on a darker brown coat.
- Melanistic (black): The coat is dark with shades of black and greyish-brown all year. No light-coloured tail patch or spots are seen.

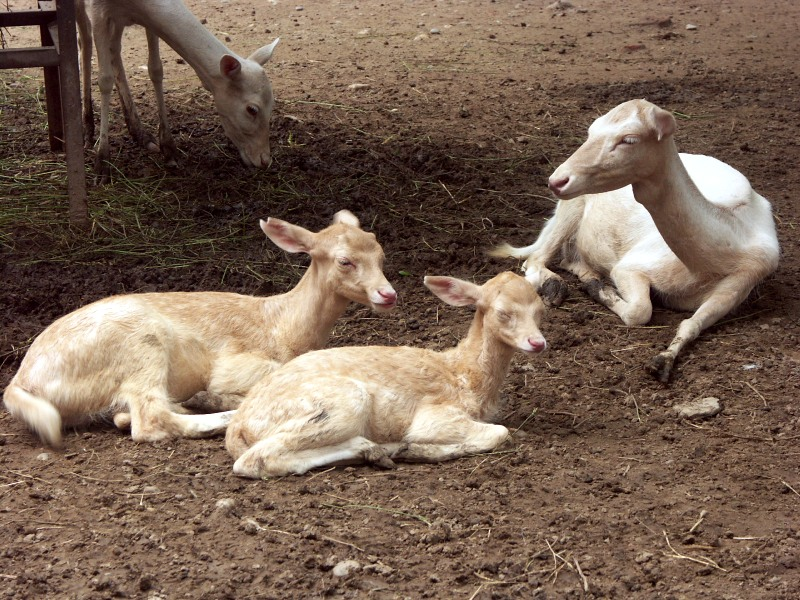
White variants of fallow deer in the Beijing Zoo

- Leucistic (white, but not albino): Fawns are cream-coloured; adults become pure white, especially in winter. Dark eyes and nose are seen. The coat has no spots.

Most herds consist of the common coat variation, yet animals of the menil coat variation are not rare. The melanistic coat variation is generally rarer, and the white coat variation is very much rarer still, although wild New Zealand herds often have a high melanistic percentage.

A skeleton of a buck (male) exhibited at the Mammal Gallery in the Natural History Museum of Pisa University

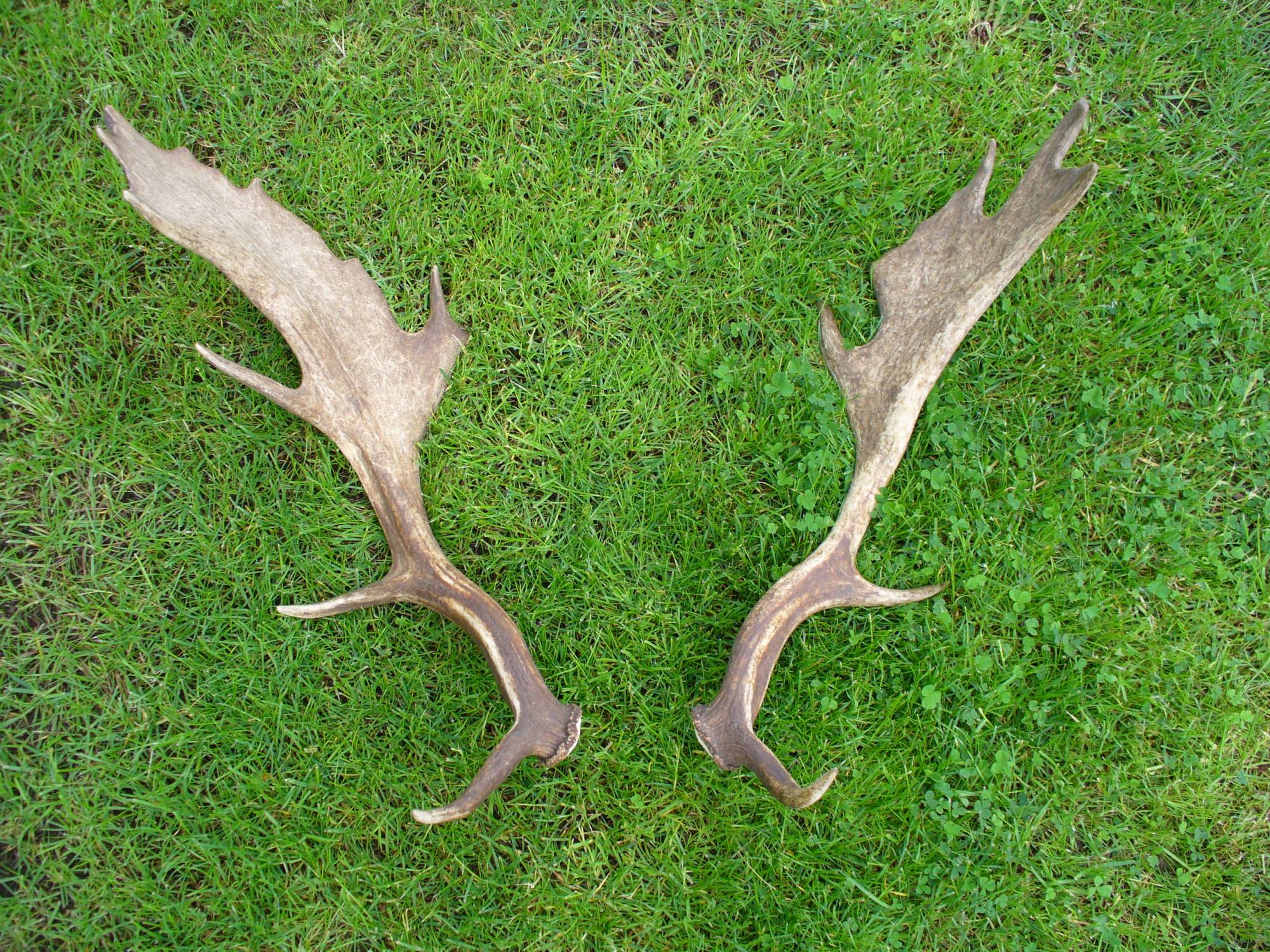
A pair of European fallow deer antlers

Only bucks have antlers, which are broad and shovel-shaped (palmate) from three years. In the first two years the antler is a single spike. Their preferred habitat is mixed woodland and open grassland. During the rut, bucks spread out and females move between them; at that time of year fallow deer are relatively ungrouped compared with the rest of the year, when they try to stay together in groups of up to 150.

Agile and fast in case of danger, fallow deer can run at a maximum speed of 50 km/h (30 mph) over short distances. Being naturally less muscular than other cervids such as the roe deer, they are not as fast. Fallow deer can also jump up to 1.75 m (5 ft 9 in) high and up to 5 m (16 ft) in length.

The diet of the European fallow deer has been described as highly flexible, and able to adapt to local conditions. A 1977 study of European fallow deer in the New Forest of Britain found that European fallow deer were selective mixed feeders, feeding primarily on grass (and to a less extend on herbs and browse) during the spring and summer (March–September), while primarily feeding on acorns and other mast during autumn (from September) until late December, with winter foods including grass as well as shrubs like brambles, bilberry, heather, holly, as well as ivy and coniferous material.

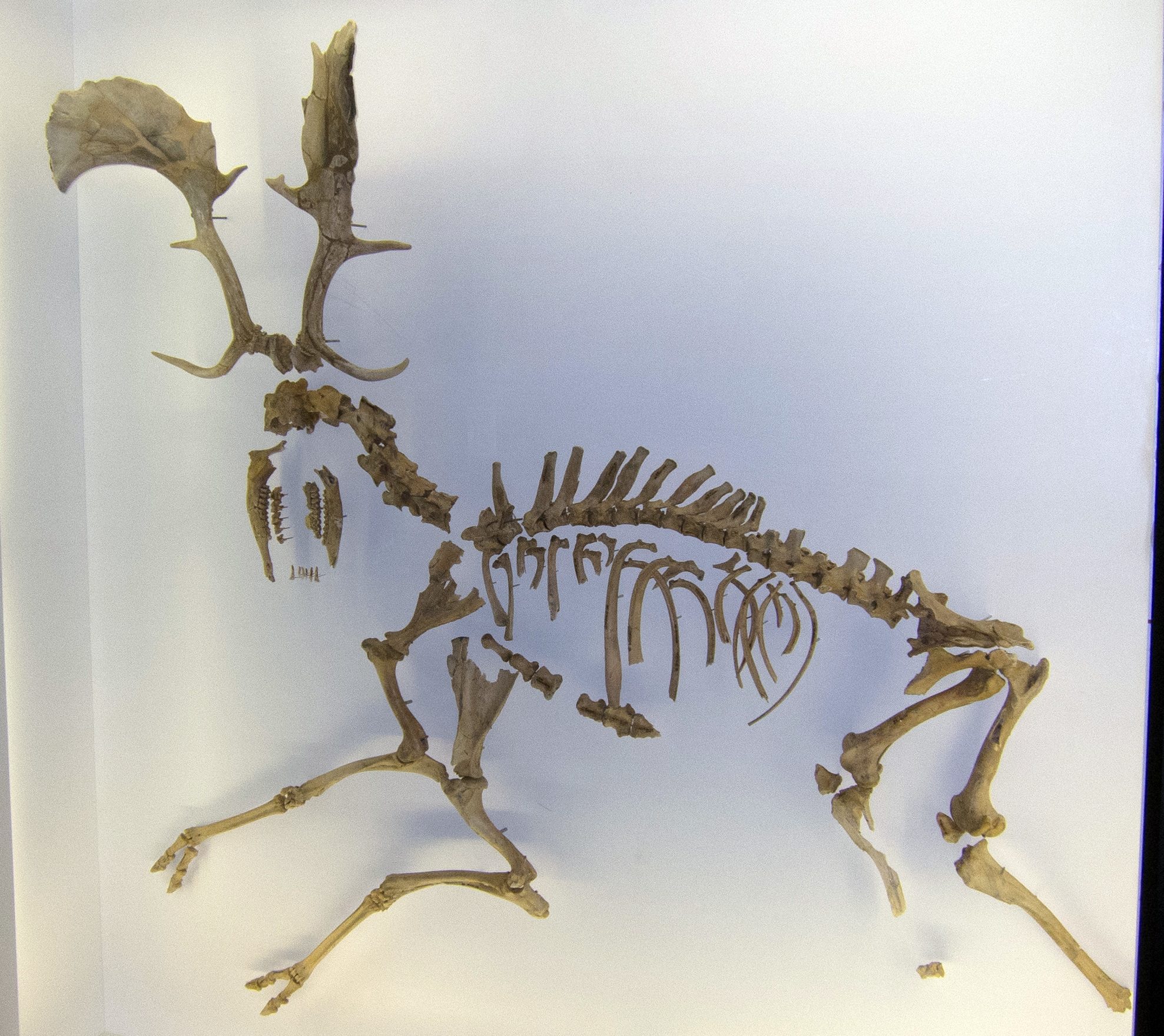
Skeleton of the extinct subspecies Dama dama geiselana

== Distribution ==
During the Last Interglacial (also known as the Eemian) around 130-115,000 years ago and prior, European fallow deer were widely distributed over Europe, occurring as far north as the British Isles. During the Last Glacial Period (115,000-11,700 years ago) the range of the species collapsed due to unfavourable climate conditions, surviving in refugia in Anatolia and probably the Balkans and possibly elsewhere, though the fossil record of their distribution during this time is sparse.

=== Turkey ===
Turkey is the only country known to have definitively natural populations of European fallow deer since the Last Glacial Maximum, but populations there (alongside those of the Persian fallow deer, which also formerly occurred in Turkey) have since become endangered and almost fully extirpated. European fallow deer in Anatolia underwent a major population decline due to the spread of agriculture (leading to the deforestation of lowland forests) and hunting, and populations in the Marmara and Aegean regions went extinct by the turn of the 20th century. Other wild populations of Turkish fallow deer survived for longer on islands at Ayvalık Islands Nature Park, Gökova, and Adaköy near Marmaris, but also appear to have died out in recent years. Currently, the only extant wild population of the species known to be undoubtedly natural lives in Düzlerçami Game Reserve in the Mount Güllük-Termessos National Park in southern Turkey, although the area has been largely fenced since, making the population only semi-wild. This population is very few in number and is genetically distinct from other European fallow deer.

A 2024 study suggests that the Turkish populations of fallow deer are ancestral to most fallow deer found throughout Europe as well as introduced populations worldwide. The translocations of fallow deer out of Turkey were facilitated by Roman-era trade networks. The only other refugium found was one in the Balkans, whose surviving descendants are significantly fewer in number.

=== Native but originally extinct ===
==== Southern Balkans ====
On mainland Greece and some Greek islands, such as Corfu, Kythira, and Thasos, that were connected to mainland due to lower sea level or proximity to land, fallow deer were present during the last ice age. A belief arose that the species was almost extinct in Greece, returning during the Neolithic. Contrary to that, remains indicate that reduced numbers survived in several parts of the country like in Thessaly, Peloponnese and Central Greece, increasing and becoming common during mid Neolithic, but mostly east of Pindus mountain range and especially in Macedonia and Thrace. During the Neolithic period and the Bronze Age, the species survived on the islands of Corfu and Thasos, appeared on Euboea, and began to be introduced by man to other islands, including Crete, some of the Cyclades, Rhodes, Chios, Lesbos, Samos and Sporades.

Early-historic-period remains have been found in eastern Greece and on the islands of Thasos, Chios, Rhodes and Crete. A few surviving individuals were observed on Samos in 1700, while the species became extinct on Lesbos late in the Ottoman period. On the Greek mainland, wild fallow deer survived until the 16th century in northeastern Chalkidiki, until the 19th century in the forests of Mount Olympus, Vermio Mountains, Arakynthos, Evrytania and Boeotia and until the 1910s in Thesprotia. The last individuals were hunted in Acarnania during the 1930s.

In Bulgaria, the autochthonous population of fallow deer is believed to have declined and disappeared after the 9th or 10th centuries, and the species was reintroduced there much more recently. The species remained in European Turkey into the 19th century. A male fallow deer was captured in Thrace in 1977 and translocated to Düzlerçamı, suggesting that a small population existed there at that time. In Albania (possibly in Butrint), the fallow deer seemed to be plentiful during the first half of the 19th century.

A 2024 genetic study suggests that the Balkans served as one of two refugia for fallow deer during the glacial periods, alongside Anatolia. Members of this population were also translocated around Europe during the Iron Age and Roman Empire, but have largely been replaced by Turkish-origin fallow deer (including in their native Balkans) aside from parts of southern Europe. The Balkan fallow deer are thought to represent the ancestors of modern Iberian, Italian, and Rhodes fallow deer, with the Rhodes population dating back to Neolithic translocations.

==== Possible native populations ====
Aside from Turkey, other areas of Europe that could have potentially served as refuges for the species during the last ice age include parts of the eastern Mediterranean, including most of the Italian Peninsula, parts of the Balkans, and the Greek island of Rhodes, all of which still host populations of this species. However, palaeontological and archaeozoological evidence of the species' diffusion into these areas during the ice age is very fragmentary, thus whether the present populations in these areas are truly native descendants of relict populations or were introduced by humans is unknown. Presently, the IUCN Red List's range map lists European fallow deer as being native to Italy, Turkey, Rhodes, and most of the Balkans, as having a population of uncertain origin in central Bosnia and Herzegovina, and being introduced to the rest of Europe. In the text, though, all the eastern Mediterranean populations aside from Turkey are listed as having an uncertain origin. A 2024 study suggests that Italian and Iberian populations descend from a now-extinct Balkan population that was translocated early on.

==== Rhodes, Greece ====
The Rhodian population of European fallow deer is smaller on average than those of central and northern Europe, though they are similarly coloured. European fallow deer are said to have been introduced to Rhodes in Neolithic times; although fossils of the species on Rhodes do indeed go back to Neolithic times, no major evidence has been found of domestication, so they could be considered native. In 2005, the Rhodian fallow deer was found to be genetically distinct from all other populations and to be of urgent conservation concern. At the entrance to the harbour of Rhodes city, statues of a fallow deer buck and doe now grace the location where the Colossus of Rhodes once stood.

=== Introduced ===
Outside of Europe, this species has been introduced to Algeria, Antigua and Barbuda, Argentina, Australia, Canada, Cape Verde, Chile, the Comoros, Cyprus, the Falkland Islands, Fernando Pó, Israel, Lebanon, Madagascar, Mauritius, Mayotte, Morocco, New Zealand, Peru, Réunion, São Tomé, the Seychelles, South Africa, Tunisia, and the United States.

==== Australia ====
European fallow deer were introduced to Tasmania in 1830 and to mainland Australia in the 1880s. The deer can now be found in all Australian jurisdictions, except Western Australia and the Northern Territory. The European fallow deer is the most widespread and numerous of introduced deer species in Australia. Proper control of deer populations in New South Wales (NSW) was precluded for some years by the classification of these deer as "game animals", as well as being a feral pest species. This led to an explosion in numbers, a vast increase in range in that state, impacts on agricultural production, increased environmental damage, and a dramatic increase in vehicle accidents involving deer. This policy has since been reversed on privately held land only, and on such land the deer is once again only classified as a feral pest species; they remain game animals on public land. The NSW government now asks the public to assist by not transporting or releasing feral deer onto any land, implying that intentional release of deer has been a factor in the vast increase in range in NSW in recent years.

==== Argentina ====
The European fallow deer was introduced to Victoria Island in Neuquén Province by billionaire Aaron Anchorena, who intended to increase hunting opportunities. He also brought exotic game species to the island, including axis deer and pheasants.

==== Canada ====
The European fallow deer is listed as an invasive species in the province of British Columbia. The deer have been introduced to and survive on Mayne Island, Galiano Island, James Island, and Sidney Island.

European fallow deer reproduce and maintain herd sizes much greater than the native deer species on these islands and have no predators. The overpopulation of the deer leads to destruction of the endangered Coastal Douglas-fir and Garry oak ecoysystems.

In 2021, the Canadian federal government, local First Nations, and local residents put forward a plan to eradicate the fallow deer population on Sidney Island, a small island in the Salish Sea. In the fall of 2023, the population of European fallow deer was reduced to an estimated 212 animals for the final stage of eradication. In the fall of 2024, Parks Canada paused the eradication project for reassessment.

==== Great Britain and Ireland ====
The European fallow deer was spread across Central Europe by the Romans. Recent finds at Fishbourne Roman Palace show that European fallow deer were introduced into southern England in the first century AD. Fallow deer were established in Britain by the fourth century AD. Genetic studies have shown that this population became extinct and the fallow deer was re-introduced from Anatolia prior to the Norman conquest, not introduced from Scilly by the Normans as had previously been believed. Deer from England are a likely source of their re-introduction elsewhere in northern Europe.

European fallow deer are now widespread on the UK mainland and are present in most of England and Wales south of a line drawn from the Wash to the Mersey. Populations in the New Forest and the Forest of Dean are long-standing, and many of the other populations originated from park escapees. They are not quite so widespread in the northern parts of England, but are present in most lowland areas and also in parts of Scotland, principally in Strathtay and around Loch Lomond. According to the British Deer Society distribution survey 2007, they have increased in range since the previous survey in 2000, although the increase in range is not as spectacular as for some of the other deer species.

A significant number of the European fallow deer in the Forest of Dean and in Epping Forest are of the black variety. One particularly interesting population, known as "long-haired fallow deer", inhabit Mortimer Forest on the England/Wales border; a significant part of the population has long body hair with distinct ear tufts.

A historical herd is at Phoenix Park in Ireland, where a herd of 400–450 European fallow deer descends from the original herd introduced in the 1660s. In a 2023 study, this herd was shown to comprise the first wild deer outside of North America to have contracted SARS-CoV-2, raising concerns about a potential natural reservoir arising within European deer herds.

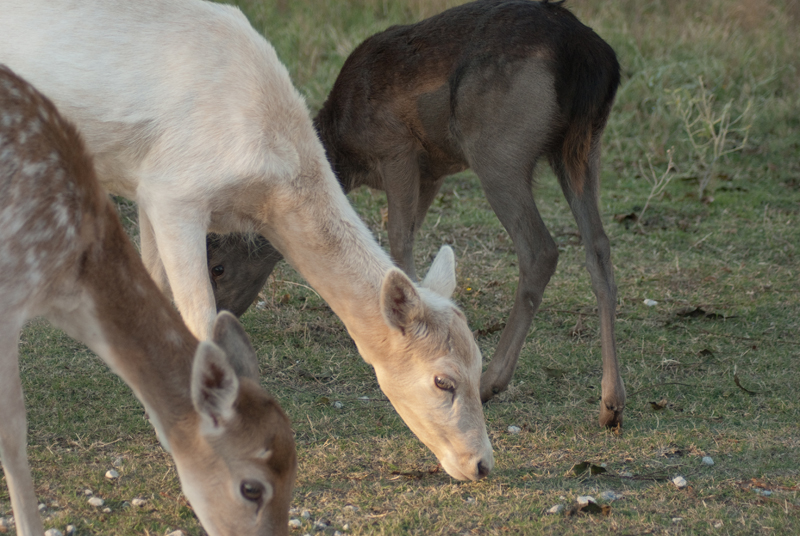
Three of the fallow deer colour variants found at the Fossil Rim Wildlife Center in Texas

==== New Zealand ====
From 1860, European fallow deer were introduced into New Zealand. Significant herds exist in a number of low-altitude forests.

==== South Africa ====
European fallow deer are popular in the rural areas of KwaZulu-Natal for hunting purposes, in parts of the Gauteng Province to beautify ranches, and in the Eastern Cape where they were introduced on game farms for the hunting industry because of their exotic qualities. European fallow deer adapted extremely well to the South African environment with access to savanna grasslands, particularly in the cooler climate ranges such as the highveld. They also occur in the western cape.

==== Sweden ====
One noted historical herd of European fallow deer is located in the Ottenby nature reserve in Öland, where Charles X Gustav of Sweden erected a dry stone wall some 4 km long to enclose a royal fallow deer herd in the mid-17th century; the herd still exists as of 2006.

==== United States ====
European fallow deer have been introduced in parts of the United States. A small feral population exists on one barrier island in Georgia. Fallow deer have also been introduced in Texas, along with many other exotic deer species, where they are often hunted on large game ranches.

In Pennsylvania, European fallow deer are considered livestock, since no feral animals are breeding in the wild. Occasional reports of wild European fallow deer in Pennsylvania and Indiana are generally attributed to escapes from preserves or farms.

A herd of white European fallow deer is located near Argonne National Laboratories in northeastern Illinois.

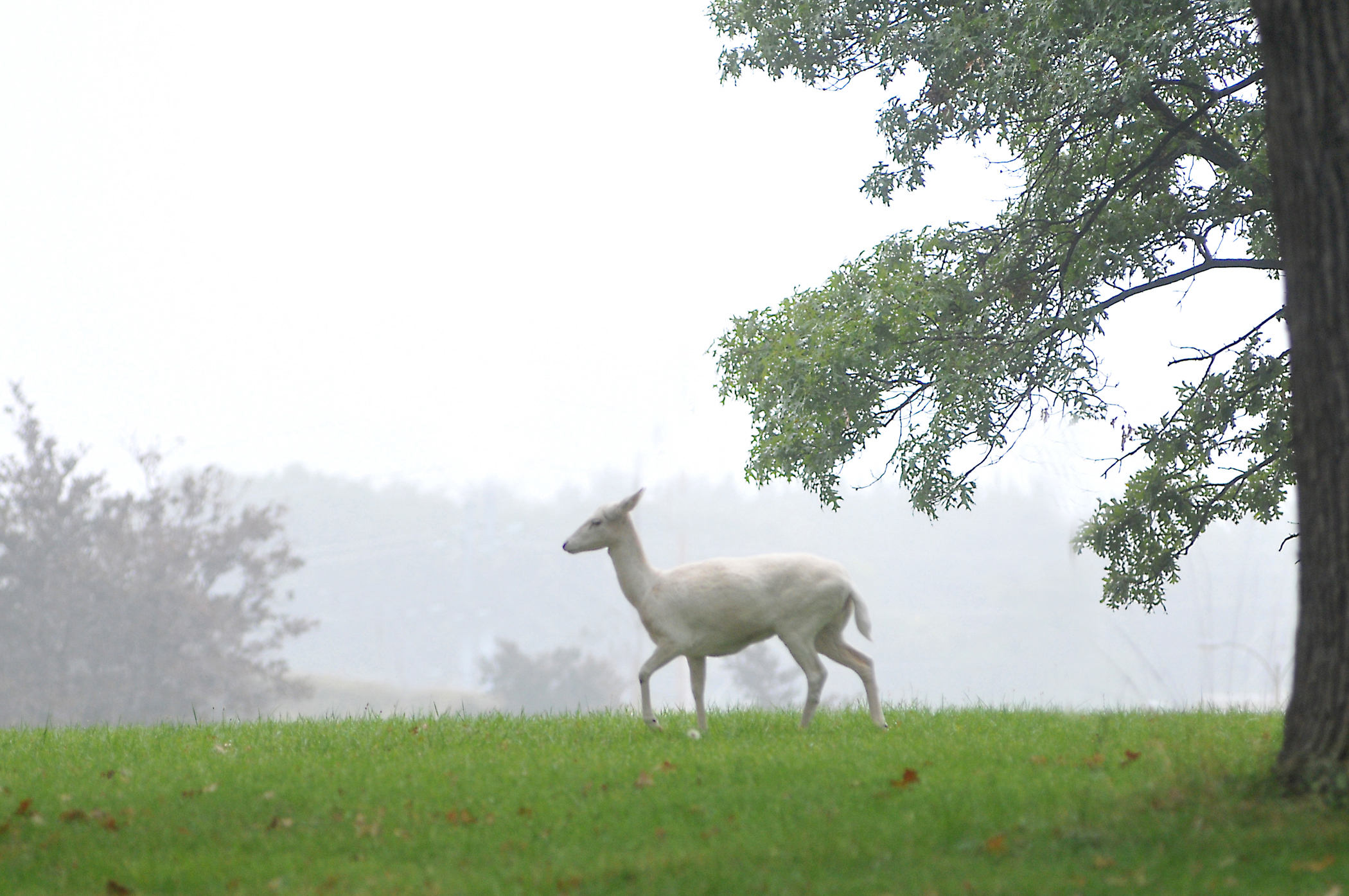
White European fallow deer near Argonne National Labs in Westmont, Illinois, U.S.

A small herd of 15 mostly white European fallow deer resides at the Belle Isle Nature Zoo on Belle Isle in Detroit, Michigan. Until the turn of the 21st century, this herd had the run of the island; the herd was thereafter confined, with extirpation being the initial goal.

A small herd, believed to be the oldest in the United States, exists in the Land Between the Lakes National Recreation Area (LBL) in far western Kentucky and Tennessee. The European fallow deer herd in the LBL "was brought to LBL by the Hillman Land Company in 1918. LBL's herd is believed to be the oldest population of fallow deer in the country, and at one time was the largest. Today, the herd numbers fewer than 150 and hunting of fallow deer is not permitted. Although LBL's wildlife management activities focus on native species, the fallow herd is maintained for wildlife viewing and because of its historical significance."

European fallow deer are present in the Point Reyes National Seashore, California, and Mendocino County near Ridgewood Ranch, west of Redwood Valley, California; some of them are leucistic.

European fallow deer were introduced into Washington State. A population of wild fallow deer still exist on Spieden Island. The deer were introduced in 1969 in an attempt to create an exotic large game hunting resort on the island. The hunting resort was subject of a negative report on the resort's operations by Walter Cronkite and was shut down less than a year later. European fallow deer continue to reproduce and inhabit the island with mouflon and Sika deer. European fallow deer were declared a "deleterious exotic wildlife species" in Washington State in 1992; all escaped fallow deer are considered a public nuisance.

== Mating system ==
European fallow deer are highly dimorphic, polygynous breeders; the breeding season or rut lasts about 135 days. In the Northern Hemisphere, the breeding season tends to occur in the second half of October, while it occurs in April in the Southern Hemisphere, some matings can still occur before and after. This mating behaviour within the rut most often occurs in leks, where males congregate in small groups on mating territories in which the females' only purpose for visiting these territories is for copulation. Variation within European fallow deer mating systems occurs; other than the traditional behaviour of lekking, different types of mating behaviours can include harems, dominance groups, stands, temporary stands, and multiple stands.

Different populations, environmental variation, size, and even age can determine the type of variation within a European fallow deer mating system, but lekking behaviour is the most commonly found and studied in nature; variation can be explained by three characteristics (1) the optimal strategy under specific environmental or social conditions, (2) the strategy of an individual may be dependent on the strategies of other individual males within the same population, and (3) individual males may be less capable at gaining access to females, since they can be outcompeted by other males that are more capable.

Female European fallow deer are polyestrous; they are receptive to males during multiple periods of estrus throughout the mating season while not gestating. Male rut behaviour includes licking and sniffing around the anus and vulva to determine whether a female is fertile. Males produce high-pitched whines repeatedly to initiate mating; following this display, a female may allow the male to mount; copulation can last as long as 5 minutes.

=== Ecology and mating system characteristics ===
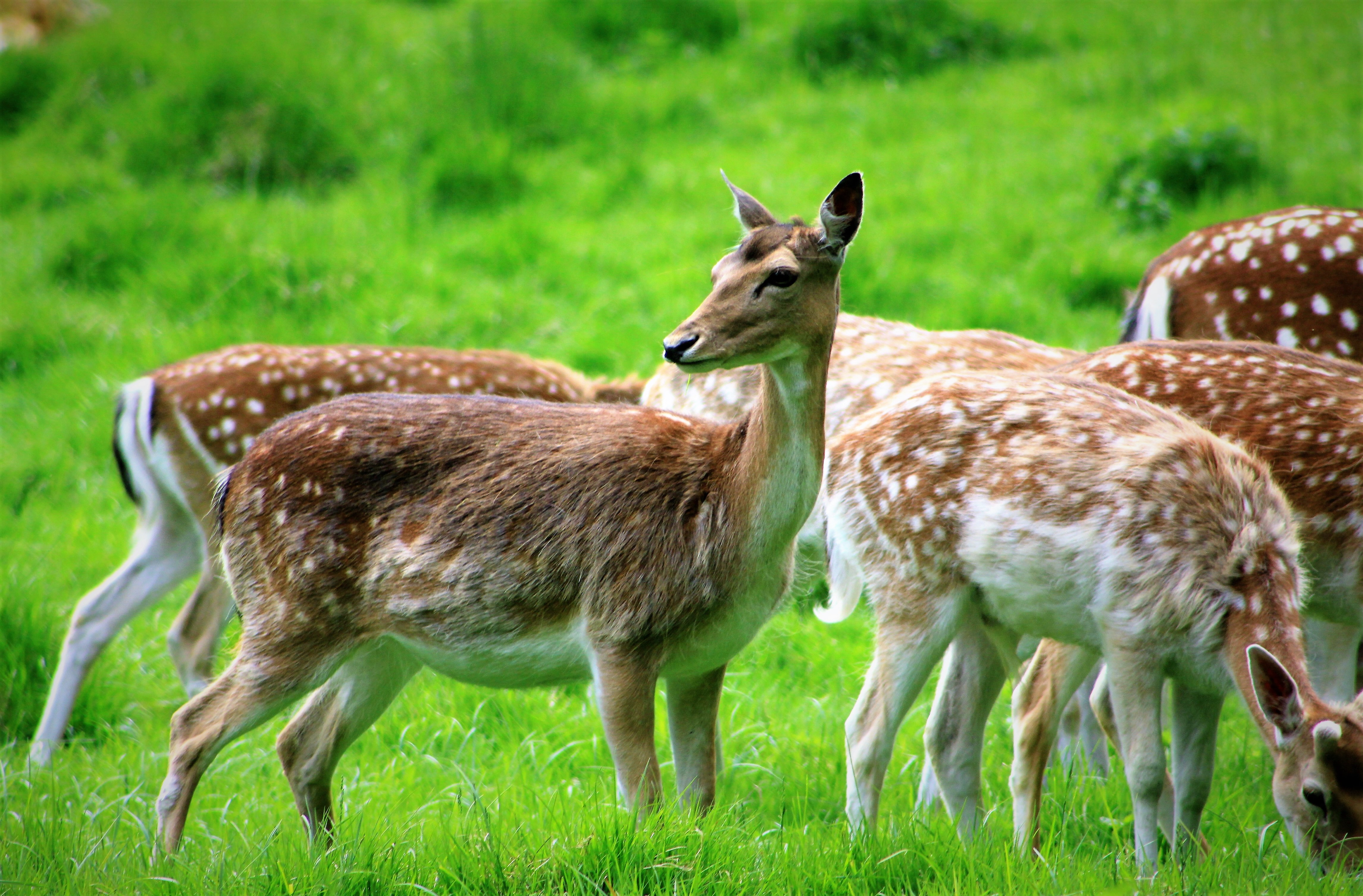
Fallow deer herd

Many deer species—including European fallow deer—have a social organization that can be tremendously plastic depending on their environment, meaning that group size and habitat type are closely linked to herd size. Most of the detailed research on the ecological characteristics and behaviour of European fallow deer occurs in large blocks of woodland, which means some bias may be present. European fallow deer can be found in a variety of habitats, which can range from cool and wet to hot and dry. European fallow deer seem to have a preference for older forests with dispersed areas of grass, trees, and a variety of other vegetation. The largest herd occurs right before the rutting season, while the smallest groups are females with fawns. Throughout a large portion of the year, the sexes remain separated and only congregate during the mating months, but other patterns may be described, such as bachelor groups and even mixed groups.

Male European fallow deer produce low-frequency vocalizations called groans; the sound of these groans results from the consistent and complex shape of the vocal tract involving the oral and nasal cavities.

Ruts are characterized by males gaining the best territory possible to increase their odds for mating, and are often characterized by the presence of females on stands. During this time, males stop feeding to defend their ruts from subordinate males. Males defending this territory often lose an average of 17% of their body weight, and the liver exhibits steatosis, which is reversible. Throughout breeding seasons, the males may obtain the same rut; in some cases, ruts can be held by more than one individual; some possibilities for this include high population density and less rut space, or more suitable habitats, which can be shared.

=== Parental care ===
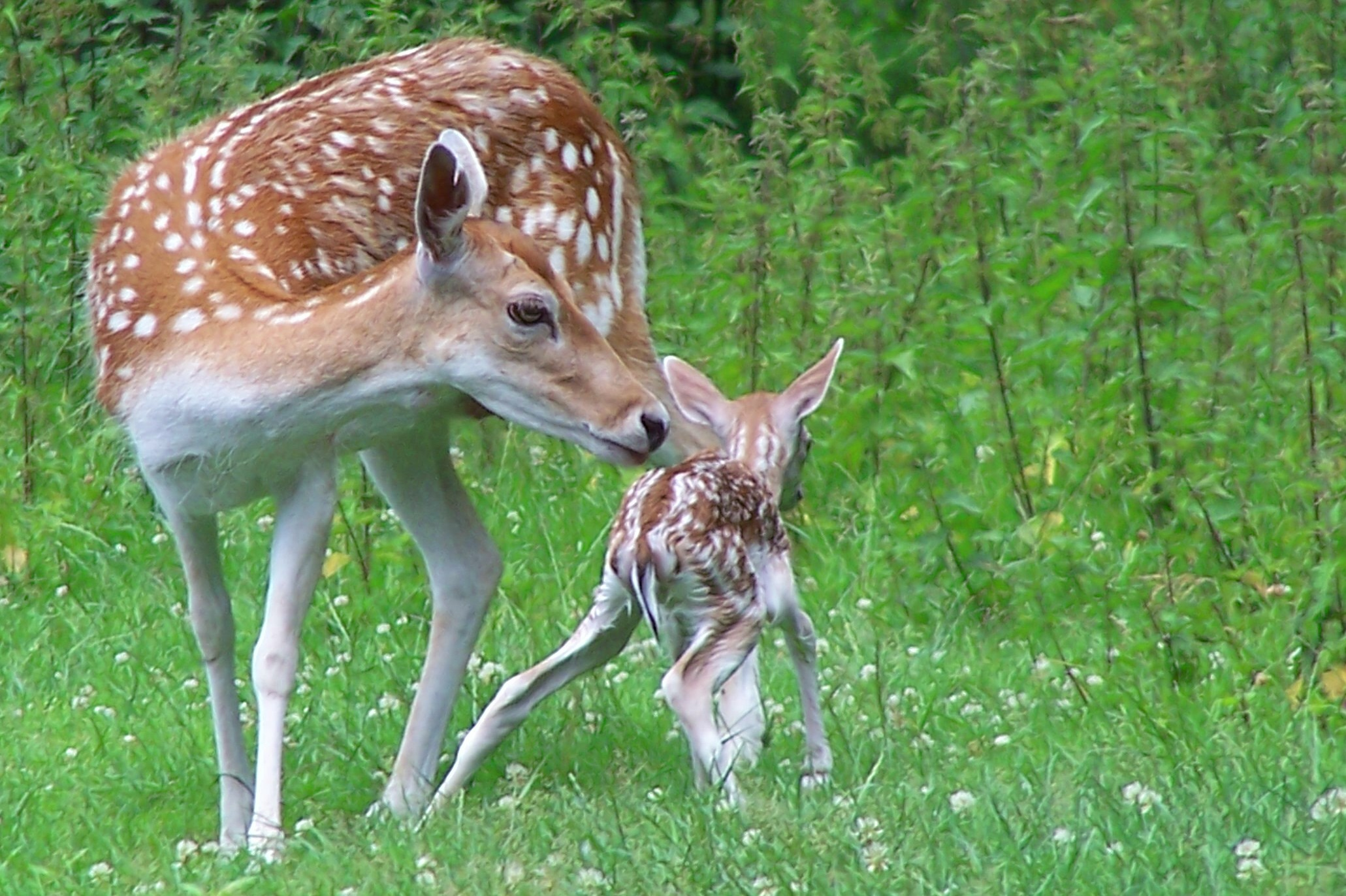
Mother European fallow deer and fawn

After a female is impregnated, gestation lasts up to 245 days. Usually one fawn is born; twins are rare. The females can conceive when they are 16 months old, whereas the males can successfully breed at 16 months, but most do not breed until they are 48 months old. The females can become very cagey just before they give birth to their fawn and find secluded areas such as a bush or cave; sometimes females give birth near the herd. As soon as the female gives birth, the she then licks the fawn to clean it; this helps initiate the maternal bond between the two, and only females provide parental investment; males do not participate in rearing the fawn.

After the birth of the fawn occurs, the females do not return to the herd for at least 10 days and for most of the days the mother is separated from the fawn, returning only to feed the fawn. The nursing period lasts about 4 months and happens every 4 hours each day. Rumination is a critical part of development in the fawn's life, and this develops about 2 to 3 weeks into the fawn's life. Females initiate the weaning periods for the fawn, which lasts about 20 days; 3 to 4 weeks; later, the fawn will start to follow its mother, and they will finally rejoin the herd together. The mother frequently licks the fawn's anal area to stimulate suckling, urination, and defecation, which is a critical part of the development of the fawn. Weaning is completed at around 7 months, and at around 12 months, the fawn is independent; after the 135 days of reproduction, the rut comes to an end, which can be characterized by the changes in group size and behaviour.

=== Contests and weaponry ===
European fallow deer bucks fighting at Charlecote Park

Since European fallow deer are polygynous species that congregate once every year, males must fight to obtain access to estrous females. The relationship between antler size and body condition can be treated as indicators to reflect body condition within a given year. These secondary sexual characteristics can have dual functions, which include the attractiveness of males, which females can ultimately choose, and fighting ability of the male. It was found that males with larger antlers had higher mating success, where males with asymmetrical antlers did not. When males develop their antlers, trade-offs are made between reproduction and survival. Genetic variations exist within fallow deer populations with variable antler growth, males that exhibited faster-growing antlers early in life are able to grow longer antlers without any significant cost; this shows that there is phenotypic variation among fallow deer populations.

Aggressive behaviour is often observed when individuals are seeking out mates, scarce resources, and even territories. Species that compete using their weapons usually engage with mutual agreement, but if any noticeable asymmetries are seen, such as a broken or lost weapon, this may alter the behaviour of an individual to engage in a fight. Likelihood and severity of antler damage were looked at in fallow deer, to test whether antler damage was associated with contest tactics and duration, and if an association existed with the tendency for individuals to engage in fighting. Individuals with undamaged antlers were more likely to attack, using high-risk tactics that included jumping, clashing, or backward-pushing behaviour, this was exhibited by both contestants; dominant males were more likely to have damaged antlers. Dominance ranks exist within fallow deer populations, which can be linked to aggression level and body size; when competing for a male, however, how ranks are obtained is not studied extensively.

=== Endurance rivalry ===
Male fallow deer are highly competitive during the rutting season; successful mating depends mainly on body size and dominance rank. Many factors can determine the seasonal reproductive success of an individual male fallow deer; these factors include body size, which can affect reproduction and survival. The amount of time spent in a lek can be an important factor in determining male reproductive success; energy can play an important role for the duration of competitive leks. Among ungulates, European fallow deer exhibit one of the most outstanding examples of sexual dimorphism, as males are much larger than females. For sexual selection to lead to the evolution of sexual dimorphism, where males are bigger than females, advantages must be present: (1) Advantages during combat, (2) Endurance rivalry advantage, (3) Female preference for larger males, and (4) Advantages during sperm competition. Sexual selection has chosen bigger males over an evolutionary time scale and conferred advantages during competition of mates by a variety of mechanisms, which are intrasexual competition, access to females, and resource accessibility, which affects attractiveness to females.

Body size is important during male-male agonistic interactions and endurance rivalry, while females tend to have a preference for larger males. Dominance rank is a good indicator of body size and body mass, but age was not an important factor. In a study done by McElligott et al. (2001), it was found that mating success was related to body size, pre-rut and rut rank. Similarly, in another study, researchers found that age, weight, and display effort were all significant factors in determining mating success; in both studies, mating success was measured by the frequency of copulations, which means that a variety of factors in different fallow deer populations can affect the overall energy allocation which will ultimately affect mating success. Maternal investment early in life can be critical to the development of body size, since it can be quite variable at that stage depending on resources and habitat type. Mature male body size can be a better indicator of overall male quality rather than body mass, since body mass depends on a variety of resources each year and is not a static trait; body mass can be a complex trait to measure.

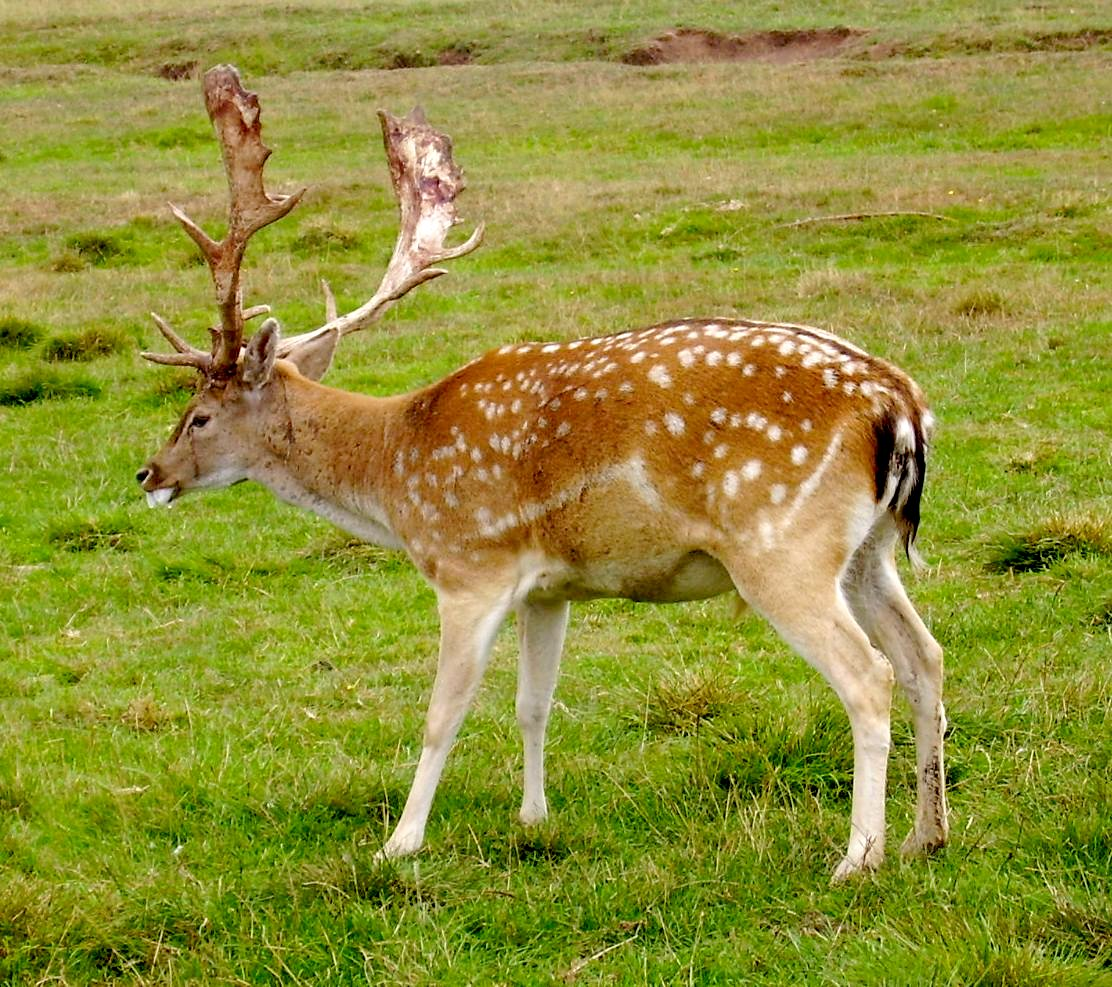
Male fallow deer

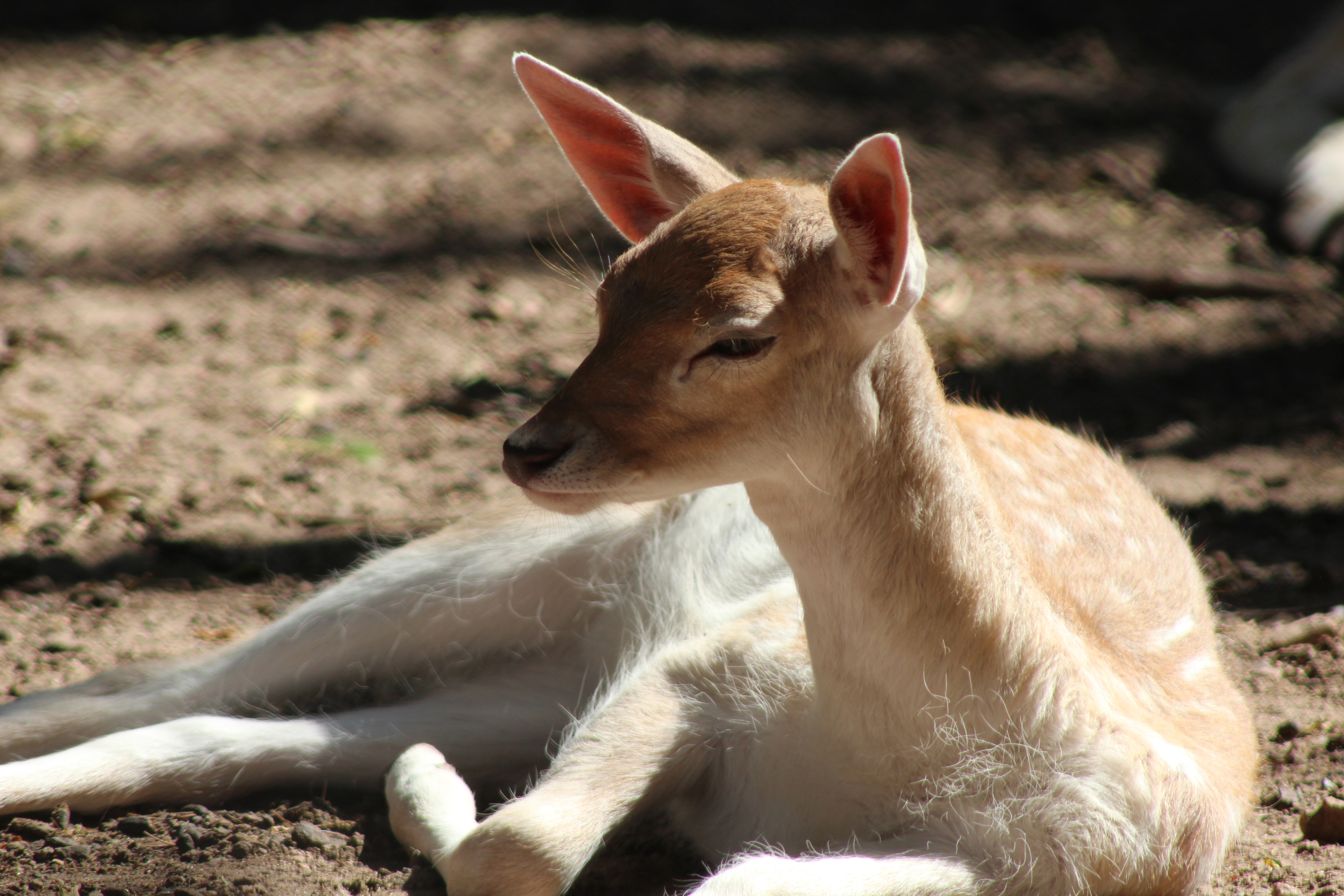
Fallow deer fawn in Uruguay

== Threats ==
Since the 20th century, a serious decline in the populations of European fallow deer has been seen in Turkey, the only region where it is definitely thought to be native, and it has disappeared from almost all regions where it was formerly found aside from Düzlerçami Game Reserve in the Mount Güllük-Termessos National Park, where a semiwild, genetically distinct population exists. The Turkish government undertook a breeding program at Düzlerçami starting in 1966, with the population growing from 7 to 500 animals, but it underwent a massive collapse until 2000 due to reasons not fully understood, but thought to be linked to urbanization, recreational activities, and poaching, and numbered less than 30 (with only 10 individuals roaming outside the fenced areas) individuals by 2007 and less than 130 individuals by 2010. This population remains at risk from inbreeding and poaching. Reintroduction to other areas of Turkey has not been successful but should still be considered to increase the species' population.

The population on Rhodes, which is of uncertain origin, but is known to be very genetically distinct from others, is also of major conservation concern. It numbers around 400–500 animals and is at risk from poaching and wildfires. The population is also at risk of outbreeding depression, as in some parts of Rhodes, mainland European fallow deer are kept in fenced areas; these deer could escape and breed with the Rhodian fallow deer. Rhodian fallow deer also damage summer crops and due to a lack of a compensation system, persecution against the population could happen. A reduction of water resources on the island due to climate change could also affect the animals. Despite this, there are signs of population recovery on Rhodes as of 2008 due to conservation measures.

Despite these threats, the European fallow deer is common across the other areas where it could potentially be native, as well as the areas throughout Europe that it was introduced to early on, thus it is considered to be of least concern by the IUCN Red List.

== See also ==
- Deer of Great Britain
