= Ottenby Bird Observatory =

Bird observatory in Öland, Sweden

Coordinates: 56°11′49″N 16°23′56″E

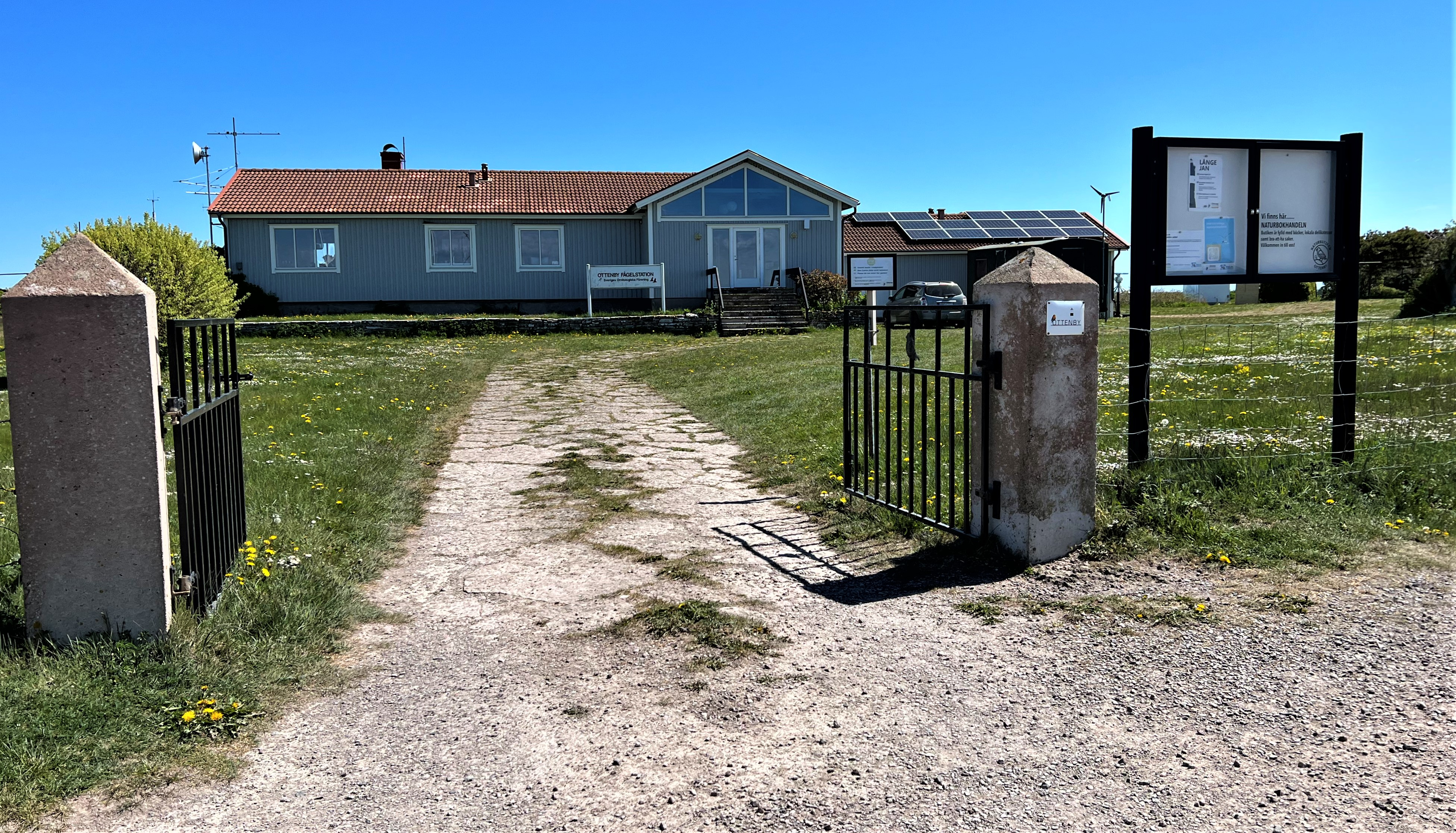
Ottenby Bird Observatory, main building (2022)

Ottenby Bird Observatory (Swedish: Ottenby fågelstation) is a bird observatory in Ottenby, on the southern tip of the Swedish island Öland in the Baltic Sea. The area's ornithological importance has been recognised for a long time, and a permanent bird observatory was set up in 1946. Bird ringing has been carried out since the start and in a standardised way since 1972. Datasets from Ottenby have been used to assess long-term changes to migratory patterns, morphometrics and population trends for several species of birds, in particular waders.

== History ==
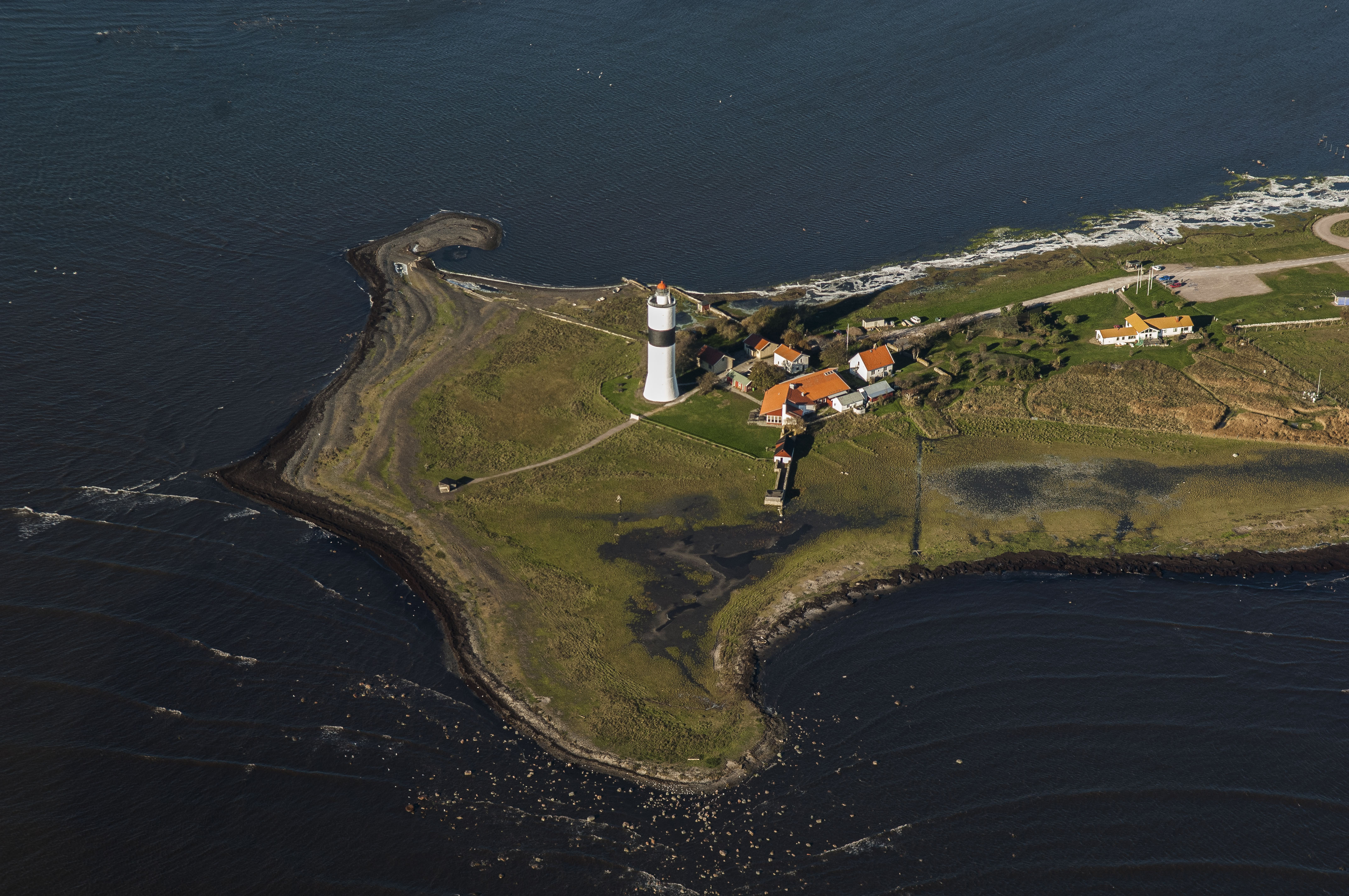
Aerial view of the bird observatory, next to the Långe Jan lighthouse

The area's ornithological importance has been recognised for a long time. Carl Linnaeus visited it in 1741. The first methodological observations on birds were made in Ottenby by Friedrich Wilhelm Meves during the 19th century. It became an established locale for ornithological research following pioneering work on wader migration done in Ottenby by Gustaf Kolthoff and published in 1897.

In the late summer of 1937, ornithologists Gunnar Svärdson and Ulf Bergström spent several weeks at Ottenby, initially with the aim of studying waders. They were housed in the auxiliary buildings of the lighthouse Långe Jan and rigged several traps to catch migratory birds. In one case, they by mistake also trapped a young bull. They realised that the place was also suitable for studying other migratory birds, besides waders. Svärdson and Bergström returned the next year, but there was then a hiatus of visits until the end of World War II. In January 1945 the predecessor of BirdLife Sverige, the Swedish Ornithological Society, was founded with Svärdson as its vice chairman. Already from the outset the new organisation had as a goal to establish a bird observatory at Ottenby. The new observatory would be modelled on Heligoland Bird Observatory and Rossitten Bird Observatory.

The predecessor of the Swedish Maritime Administration provided land close to the Långe Jan lighthouse, and money was donated by among others Axel Munthe. Construction of a permanent bird observatory began in September 1945. In March 1946 the bird observatory was finished, and field work commenced the same summer.

== Description ==
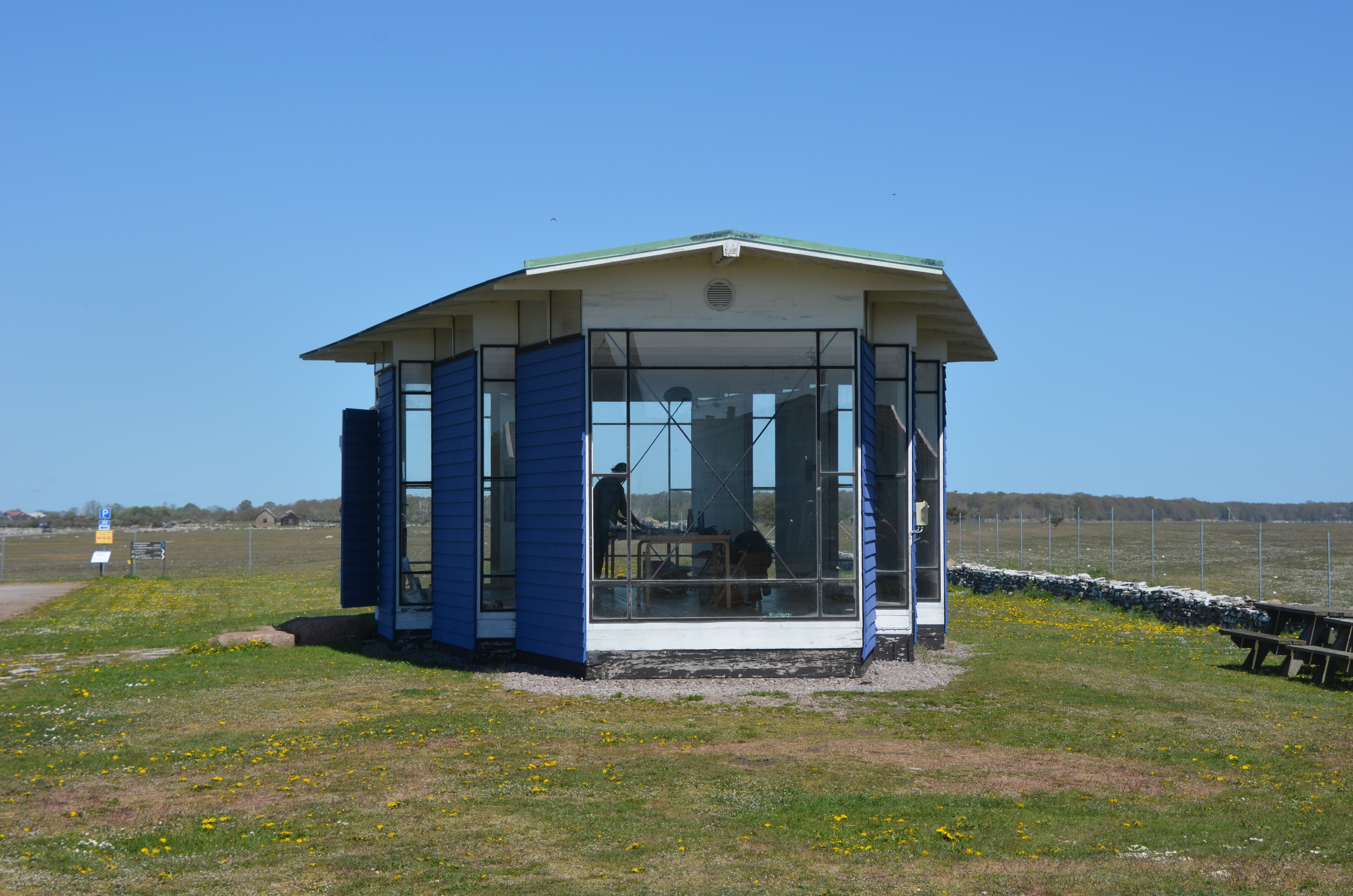
The former migratory bird museum, designed by architect Jan Gezelius and today a listed building.

Ottenby Bird Observatory is located in Ottenby on the southern tip of the Swedish island Öland in the Baltic Sea. It lies at an important funnelling point, stopover and foraging site for birds migrating to and from the Arctic on the Eurasian route of the East Atlantic Flyway. The bird observatory lies next to the Långe Jan lighthouse, and within Ottenby nature reserve, an approximately 25 square kilometres (9.7 sq mi) area that includes grazed pastures, woodland and shore meadows. Ottenby Bird Observatory has one full-time employee, who is head of the observatory, and is largely reliant on volunteers for its field work.

Close to the main building lies the former migratory bird museum, designed by architect Jan Gezelius and built 1960–1961. It functioned as a museum until 1997, when the exhibition was moved to the nearby visitor centre Naturum Ottenby. The building is a listed building. The visitor centre and museum (Naturum) was built in 1997 and contains information about bird migration and the nature of Ottenby nature reserve.

== Research ==
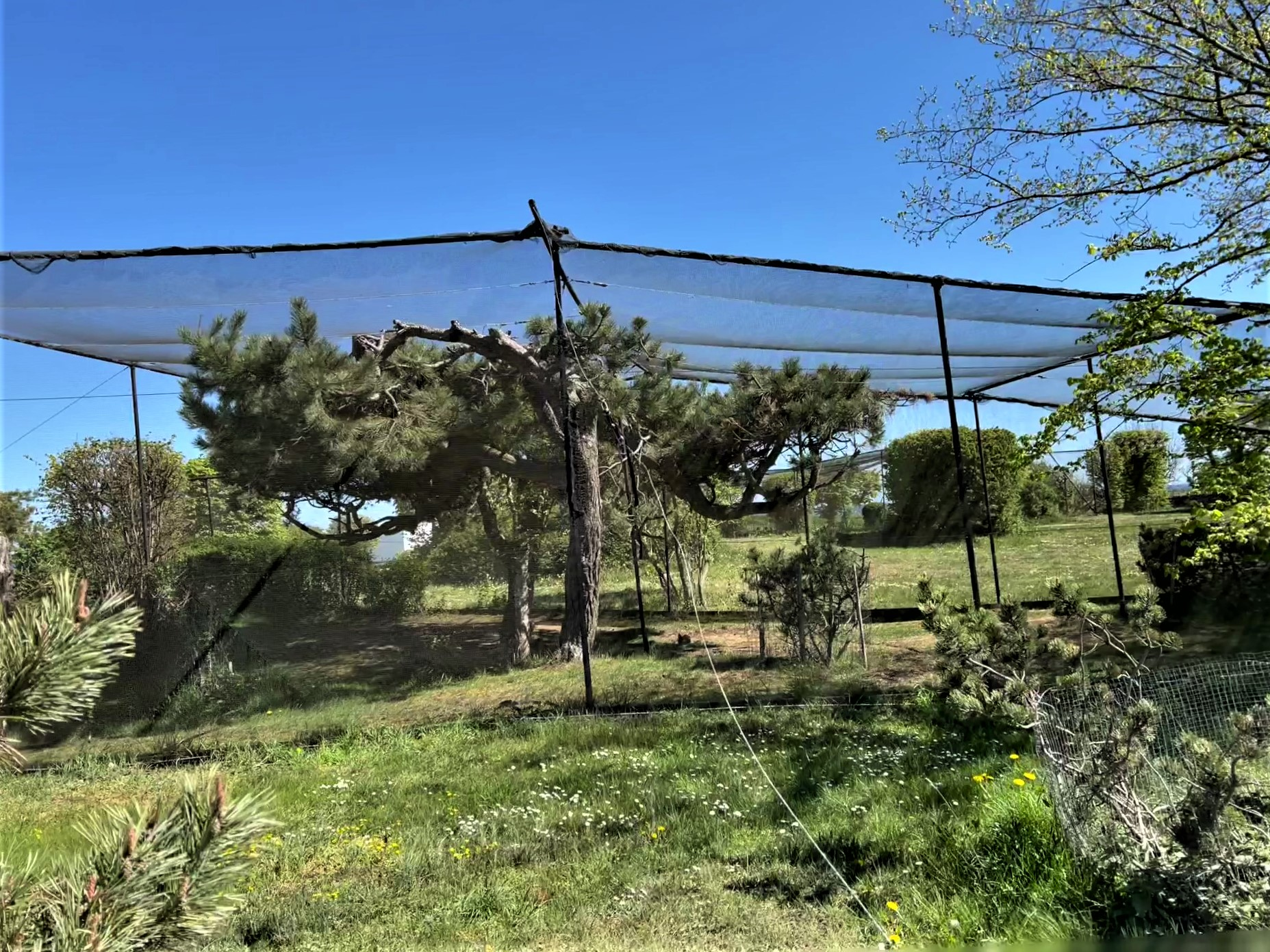
Heligoland traps at Ottenby Bird Observatory

Bird ringing has been an important part of the activity at Ottenby Bird Observatory since the start, and since 1972 it has been carried out in a standardised way. The data sets going back to 1946 constitute the longest unbroken series of systematic bird observations in the world. By 2020, more than one million birds had been netted at Ottenby. Datasets covering many years of bird migration are unusual, and can provide useful information for researchers about the behaviour of birds, particularly concerning rare species. Datasets from Ottenby have thus been used to assess long-term changes, i.a. due to climate change, to migratory patterns, morphometrics and population trends for several species of birds, and in particular waders. Another area where the bird observatory has been monitoring long-term trends is on bird flu, where samples have been collected for more than 20 years. Ottenby Bird Observatory cooperates with academic institutions, for example Lund University and Linnaeus University, and with the Swedish Environmental Protection Agency. Ottenby Bird Observatory also cooperates with Capri Bird Observatory in Italy, a Swedish-Italian bird observatory founded in 1956.
