= Ottenby nature reserve =

Nature reserve in Öland, Kalmar, Sweden

Coordinates: 56.1965°N 16.3990°E

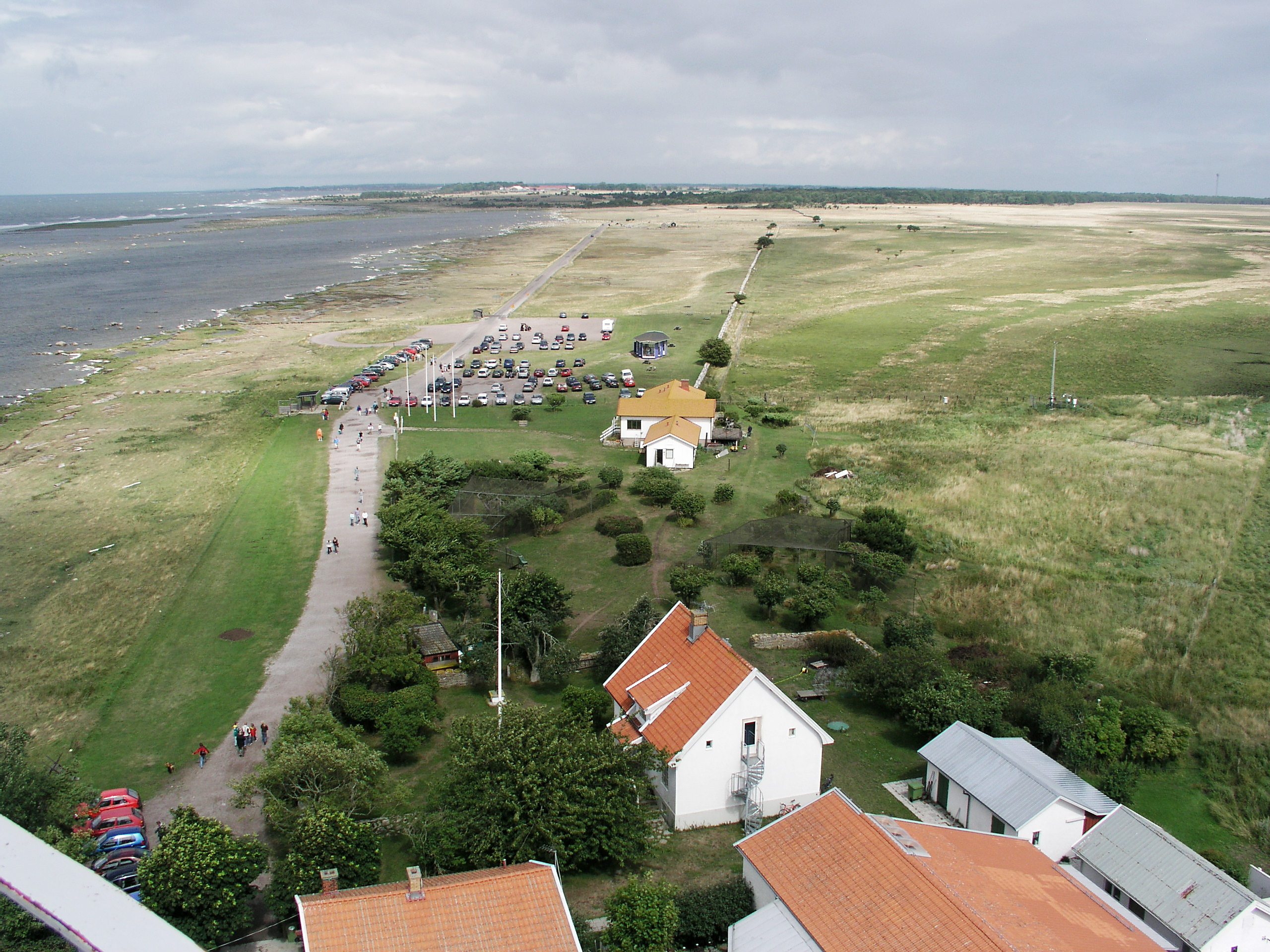
Area around the bird station.

Ottenby nature reserve is a nature reserve in Ottenby on the Swedish island of Öland, in the Baltic Sea, across from the mainland by the Kalmar Strait. A bird observatory and research centre, Ottenby Bird Observatory, has been operating here since 1946. The identification and ringing of birds is one of the main activities of the organisation, in order to ascertain particular migration routes of different species. The potential influx and spread of avian influenza (bird flu) and other pathogens is also monitored.
