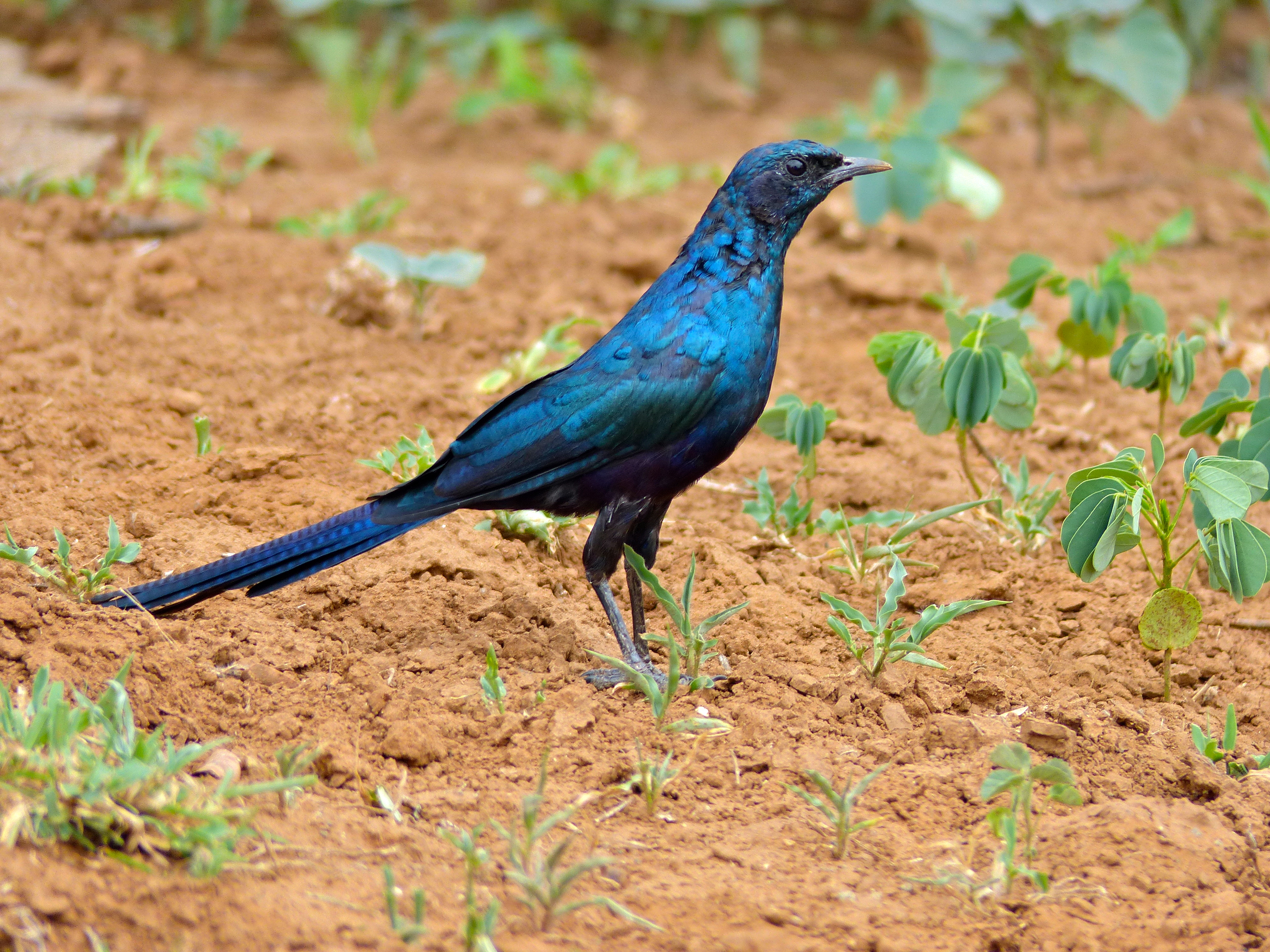
- L. m. mevesii in Kruger National Park, South Africa

Conservation status
- Least Concern (IUCN 3.1)

Scientific classification
- Kingdom: Animalia
- Phylum: Chordata
- Class: Aves
- Order: Passeriformes
- Family: Sturnidae
- Genus: Lamprotornis
- Species: L. mevesii

Binomial name
- Lamprotornis mevesii (Wahlberg, 1856)
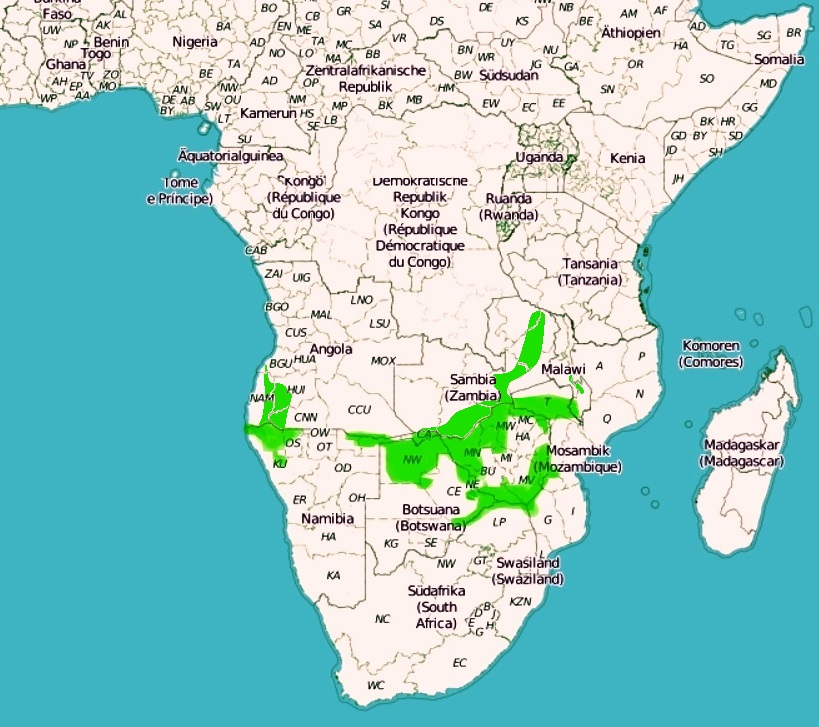
- native range

= Meves's starling =

Species of bird

Meves's starling (Lamprotornis mevesii), also Meves's glossy starling and Long-tailed starling, is a species of starling in the genus Lamprotornis. It is found in Angola, Botswana, Malawi, Mozambique, Namibia, South Africa, Zambia, and Zimbabwe.

Its English and Latin names commemorate the Germany-based Swedish ornithologist Friedrich Wilhelm Meves.

It is 30–36 cm long, with a very long tail; in dull light coloured black, but in bright light, with moderate to intensely strong iridescent gloss. It can be distinguished from the similar Burchell's starling by its longer tail with strongly graduated feathers (the central pair of tail feathers the longest, with subsequent pairs of feathers shorter to the outermost), and from other long-tailed species of Lamprotornis by its dark eyes.

Three subspecies are accepted:

- Lamprotornis mevesii benguelensis Shelley, 1906 — southwestern Angola (Angola Escarpment). Duller and browner, less glossy on the body and tail than the other subspecies.
- Lamprotornis mevesii violacior Clancey, 1973 — northern Namibia and south-central Angola. Dark, violet-purple glossed.
- Lamprotornis mevesii mevesii (Wahlberg, 1856) — southeasternmost Angola, northeastern Namibia (Caprivi Strip), Botswana, east to southeastern Zambia, southern Malawi, and northeastern South Africa. Intensely green-and-blue glossed, with some bronze gloss on the flanks.

Some authorities have treated the three as separate species, but this is not widely followed.

It is typically found in small flocks in mopane woodland, usually along major river basins, and often in areas which are flooded in the rainy season. The breeding season lasts from September to May, with peak nesting activity in February to March.

== Gallery ==
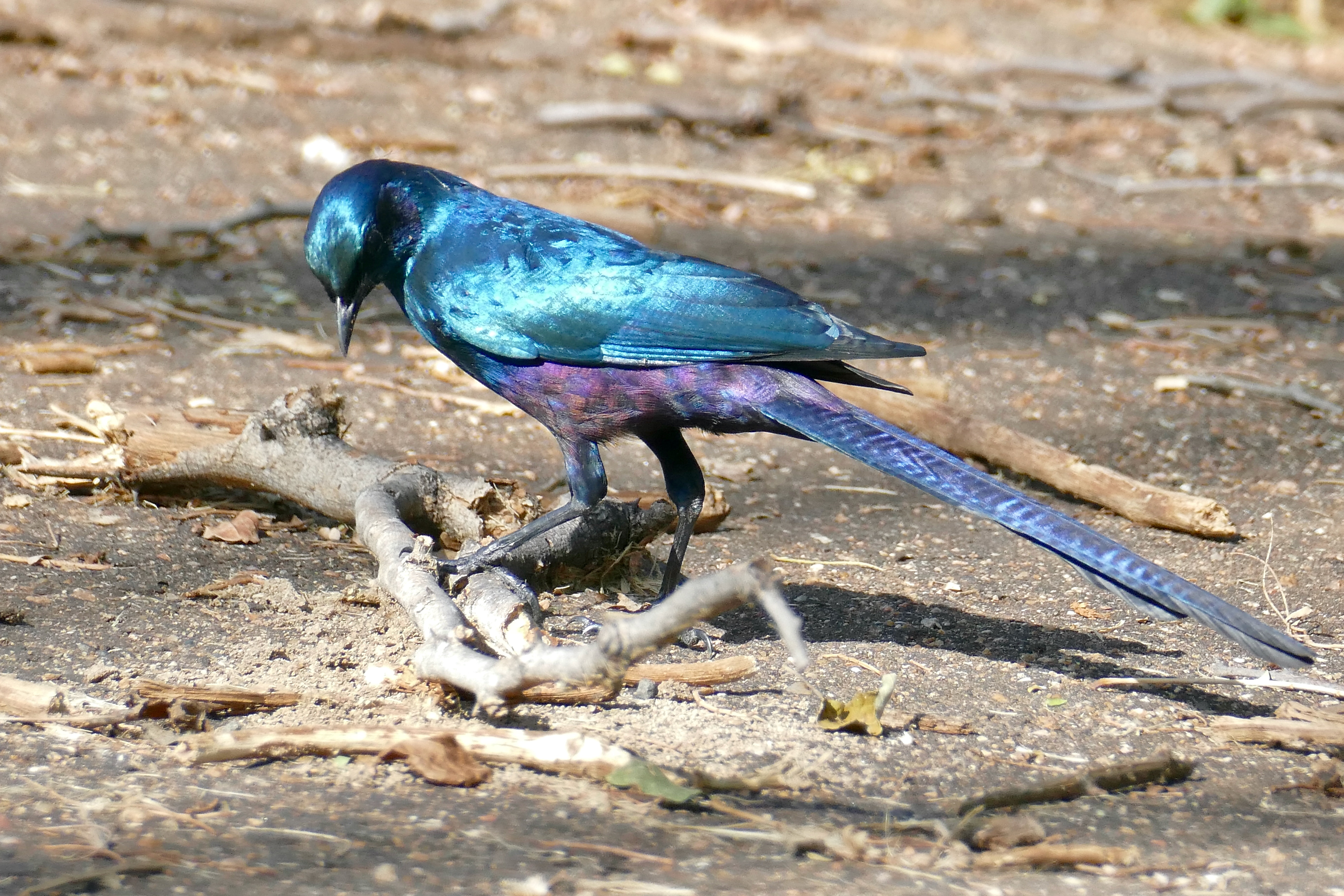
Adult L. m. mevesii in Kruger National Park

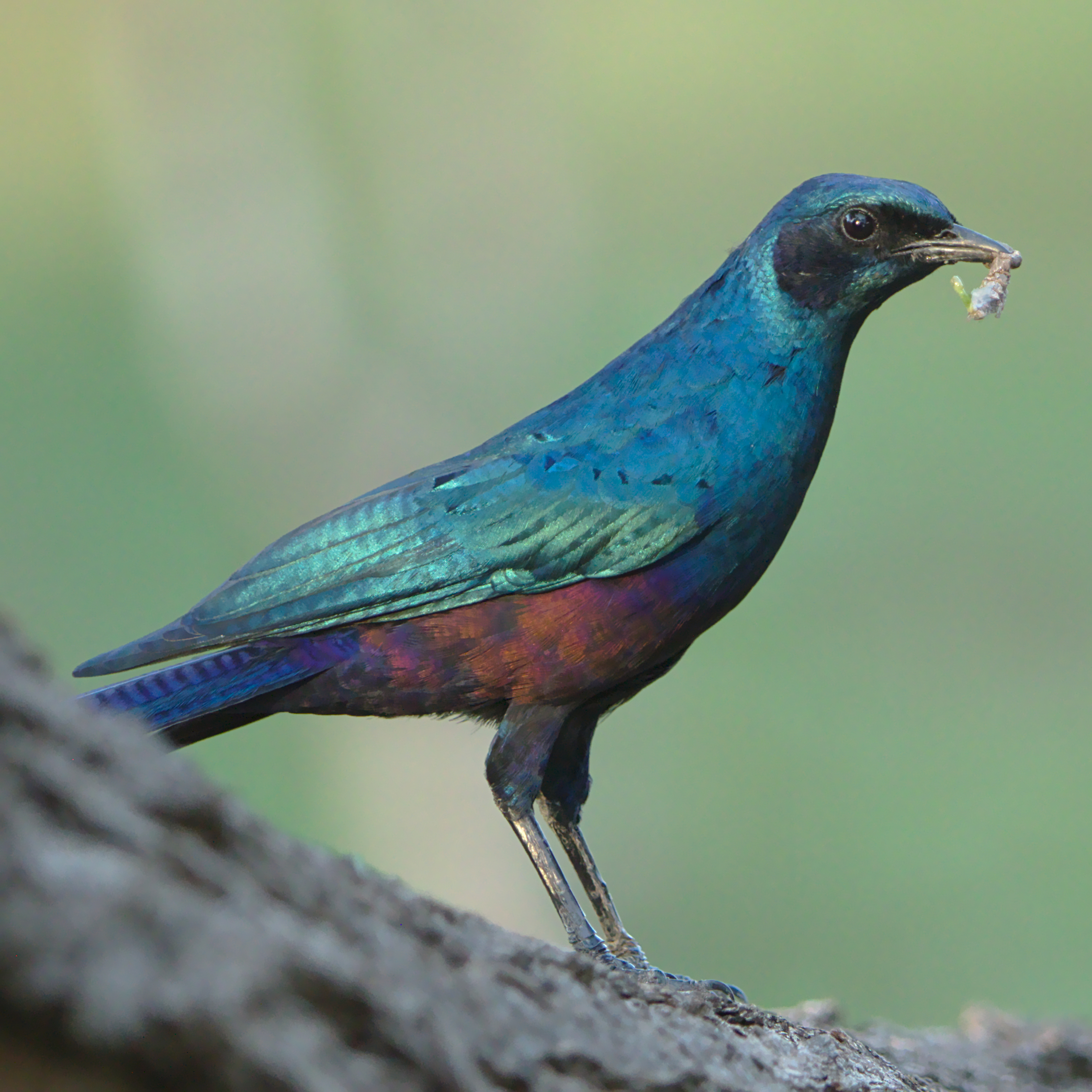
Adult L. m. mevesii showing coppery iridescence on flank plumage

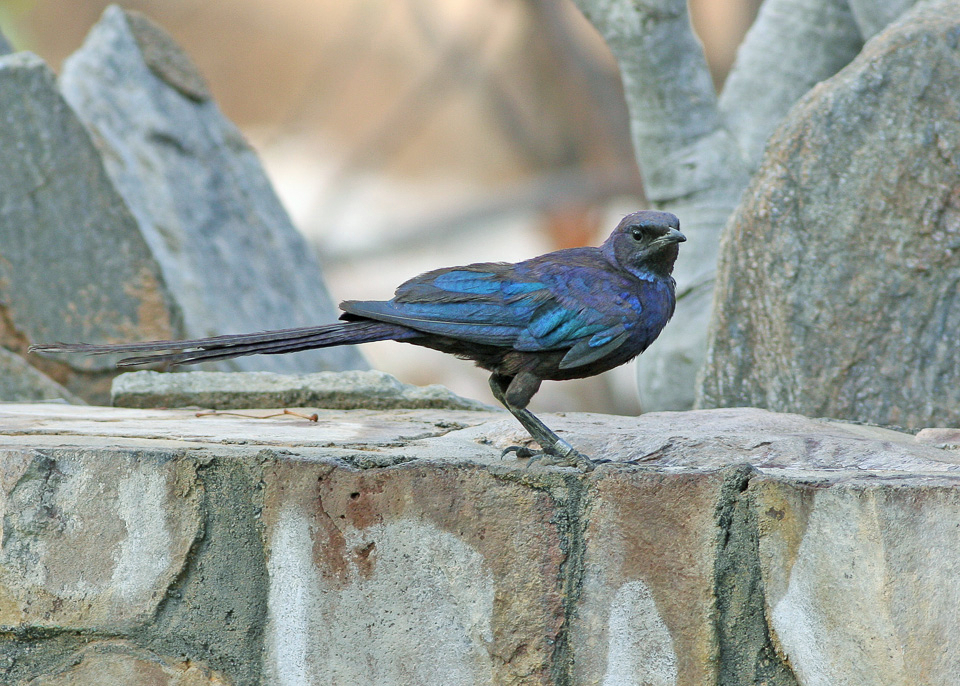
Adult L. m. violacior at Hobatere, Namibia
