= Långe Jan =

Långe Jan Lighthouse Ölands Södra Udde Öland South End
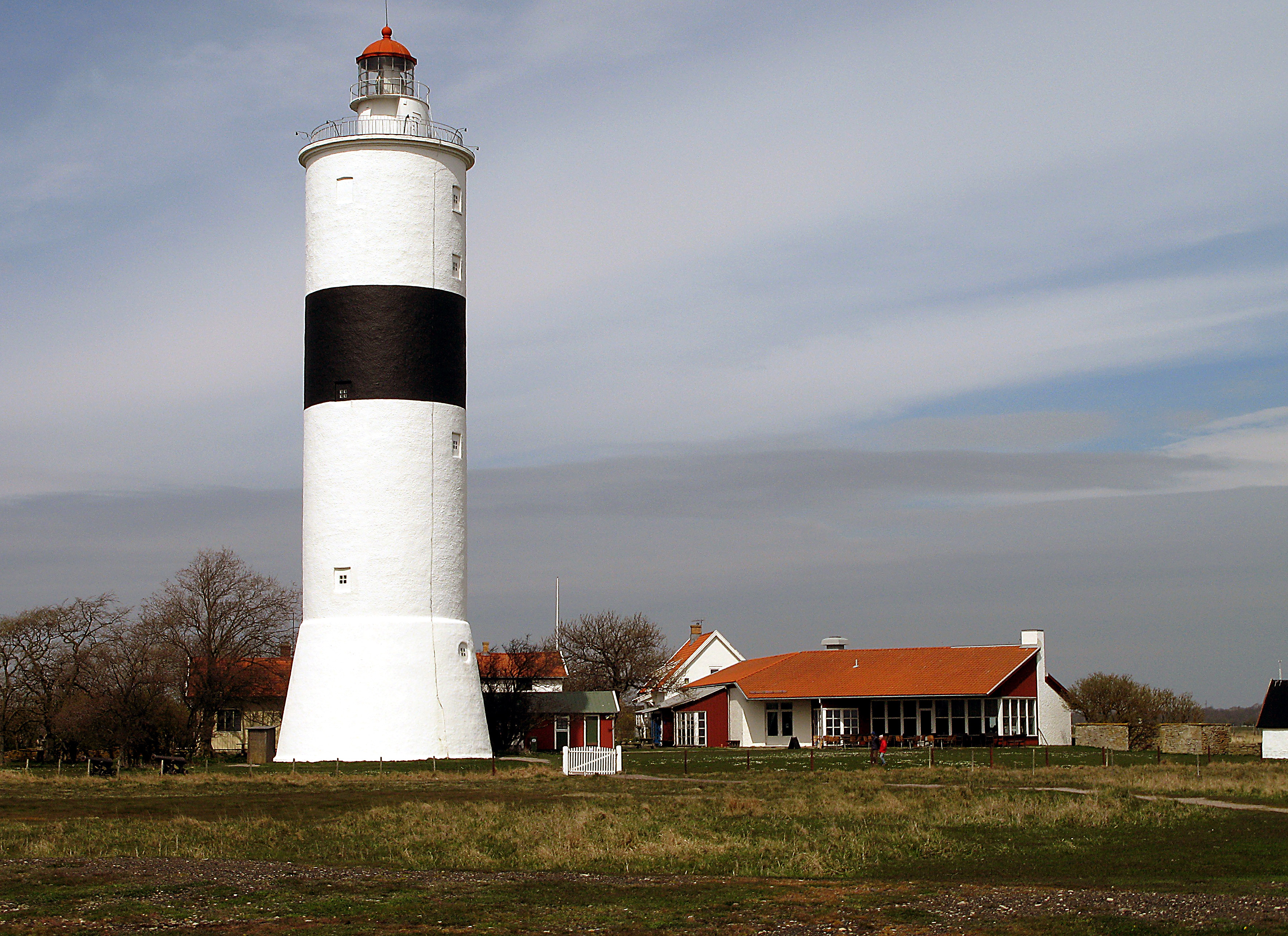
- Långe Jan
- Location: Ottenby; Öland's south cape Sweden
- Coordinates: 56.196204°N 16.398525°E

Tower
- Constructed: 1785
- Foundation: limestone
- Construction: limestone tower with balcony and lantern
- Automated: 1948
- Height: 41.6 metres (136 ft)
- Shape: cylindrical tower on a circular truncated basement with balcony and lantern
- Markings: white tower with black band, red lantern dome
- Power source: bituminous coal, rapeseed oil, kerosene, electricity
- Operator: Swedish Maritime Administration (Sjöfartsverket)
- Heritage: governmental listed building complex, governmental listed building, monument in Fornminnesregistret

Light
- First lit: 1 November 1785
- Focal height: 42 metres (138 ft)
- Lens: open fire (original), 3rd order Fresnel lens (1907)
- Range: 18 nautical miles (33 km; 21 mi)
- Characteristic: Fl (2) W 30s. F WRG at 19 metres (62 ft)
- Sweden no.: SV-5528

Långe Jan ("Tall John") is a Swedish lighthouse located at the south cape of Öland in the Baltic Sea, Sweden's second largest island. It is one of Sweden's most famous lighthouses along with Kullen, Vinga and Landsort, and also the tallest lighthouse in Sweden.

The lighthouse was built in 1785, probably by Russian prisoners of war. The tower was built of stone from an old chapel. Originally the light was an open fire, and the tower was unpainted. It was painted white in 1845, and the same year the tower's lantern was installed, to house a colza oil lamp. A couple of years later a black band was added to the tower.

The lighthouse remains in use and is remote-controlled by the Swedish Maritime Administration in Norrköping. During the summer season, visitors may climb the tower for a small fee.

The buildings surrounding the tower form Ottenby Bird Observatory.

== See also ==
- List of lighthouses and lightvessels in Sweden
- Långe Erik ("Tall Erik"), the lighthouse at the north cape of Öland.
