= Sidney Island =

Island in British Columbia, Canada

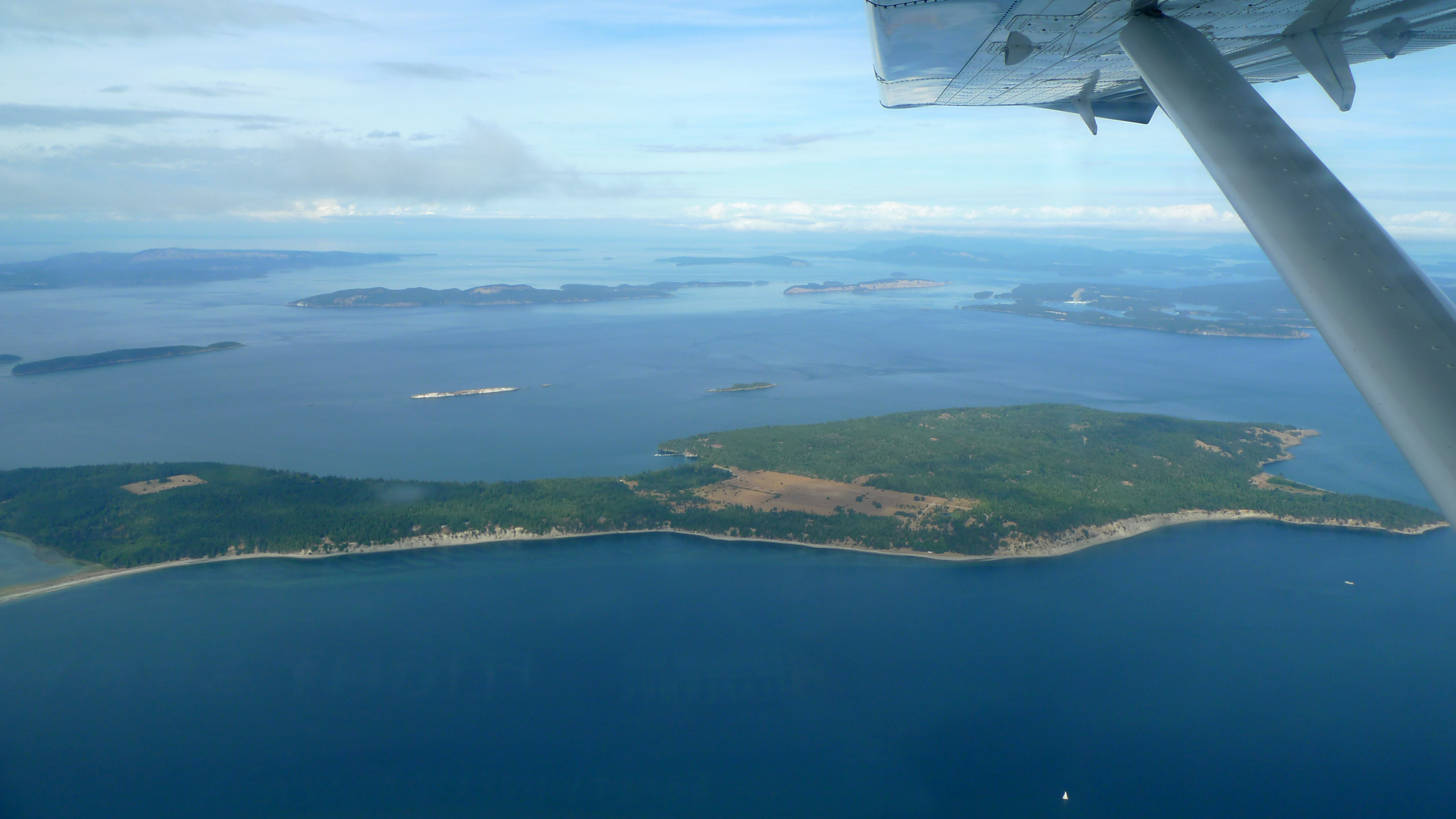
- Aerial view of Sidney Island and the San Juan Islands

- Location of Sidney Island in British Columbia
- Coordinates: 48°37′00″N 123°18′00″W
- Country: Canada
- Province: British Columbia

Area
  - Total: 8.66 km^{2} (3.34 sq mi)
- Website: parks.canada.ca/pn-np/bc/gulf

Sidney Island is one of the southern Gulf Islands located between the southwest coast of British Columbia, Canada and Vancouver Island, BC, near James Island. Sidney Island has an elevation of 77 metres (252 feet 8 inches) above mean sea level at its highest point. It is located across Sidney Channel, just east of the town of Sidney on the east coast of the Saanich Peninsula. Sidney Island is a part of the Capital Regional District, while its land titles are legally described in the Cowichan Land District. In 1859 Captain Richards named the island for Frederick W. Sidney, who, like Richards served in the survey branch of the Royal Navy.

== Gulf Islands National Park Reserve ==
The northern end of the island (including Sidney Spit, a sandspit) is part of the Gulf Islands National Park Reserve. It was formerly the Sidney Spit Marine Park under provincial jurisdiction.

Sidney Spit is accessible by kayak, canoe or boat. There are 21 mooring buoys, and dock space is available to boaters on the government dock. Sidney Spit is also accessible by the privately operated walk-on passenger ferry that runs between the Sidney Pier (in Sidney) and Sidney Spit during the summer months.

Sidney Spit is known for its sandy beaches and backcountry camping. There are 26 walk-in, backcountry camp sites available at Sidney Spit, and facilities include pit toilets and picnic tables. Due to the high sodium content there is no longer any potable water at Sidney Spit. It is recommended that visitors bring their own water. Campfires are not permitted. Wildlife is abundant on Sidney Spit, as this island is an important resting spot for migrating shorebirds.

== Sidney Island Strata ==
The southern part of the island (about 80%) is organized into a private strata corporation containing 111 strata lots, each of which is generally between one and three acres in size with 200 to 400 feet of oceanfront.
