= Ottenby =

Town in Öland, Sweden

Coordinates: 56°11′49″N 16°23′56″E

Designations

Ramsar Wetland
- Designated: 5 December 1974
- Reference no.: 17

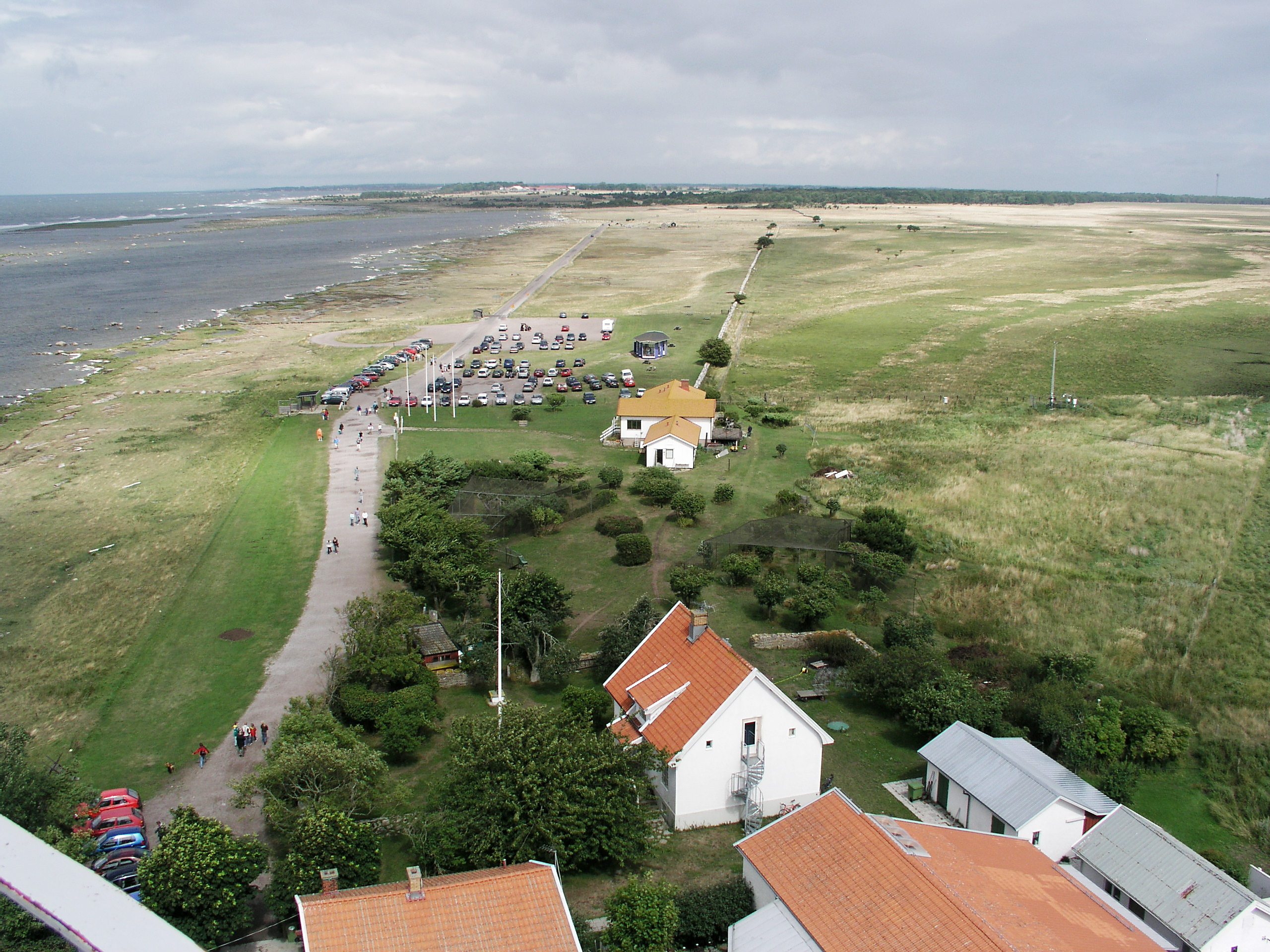
View from Långe Jan on Öland, north. Ottenby Bird Observatory can be seen in the near distance.

Ottenby (Swedish pronunciation: [ˈɔ̂tːɛnˌbyː]) is a town on the island of Öland, Sweden, located in Ås parish, Mörbylånga Municipality in Kalmar County. Ottenby is located just north of the southern tip of Öland, over thirty km south of the area's main town, Mörbylånga. Ottenby is also the name of the mansion and a royal demesne, now a nature reserve.

Sweden's tallest lighthouse, Långe Jan, is just south of Ottenby. Ottenby Bird Observatory is located adjacent to the lighthouse.

== Reserve and demesne ==
Ottenby is the name of a mansion (see Ottenby kungsgård) and the nearby nature reserve, formerly a royal game reserve stocked with fallow deer, and King Charles X Gustav of Sweden built a drystone wall to confine the native deer. The reserve is situated at the southern edge of the Stora Alvaret, a unique limestone pavement ecosystem designated as a World Heritage Site comprising most of the southern half of the island of Öland. Ottenby offers diverse habitats including coastal marsh, marine, woodland and alvar. Nearest villages include Alby, Hulterstad, Gettlinge, and Triberga.

Ottenby's name is first mentioned in writing year in 1282. In the Middle Ages it comprised 19 gardens and belonged to Nydala Abbey in Småland. After the abbey's appropriation by Gustav Vasa in the 1520s the mansion became the site of a stud farm; from 1831 to 1892 it was a stud farm for the Swedish army, and later a business.

The main building was erected in 1804 and designed by court architect Carl Fredrik Sundevall. It is a whitewashed stone building with a hipped roof. In 1935 Ottenby demesne was declared a national monument; the farm is owned by the National Property Board and farmed by the Wiström family.

== Area prehistory ==
The oldest known human settlement on the southern part of Oland is slightly to the north at Alby, dating to the Mesolithic era and showing the presence of hunter-gatherers. The village prehistory dates to the early Stone Age when settlers from the mainland migrated across the ice bridge connecting the island via the Kalmar Strait about 6000 to 7000 BCE.
