= Friedrich Wilhelm Meves =

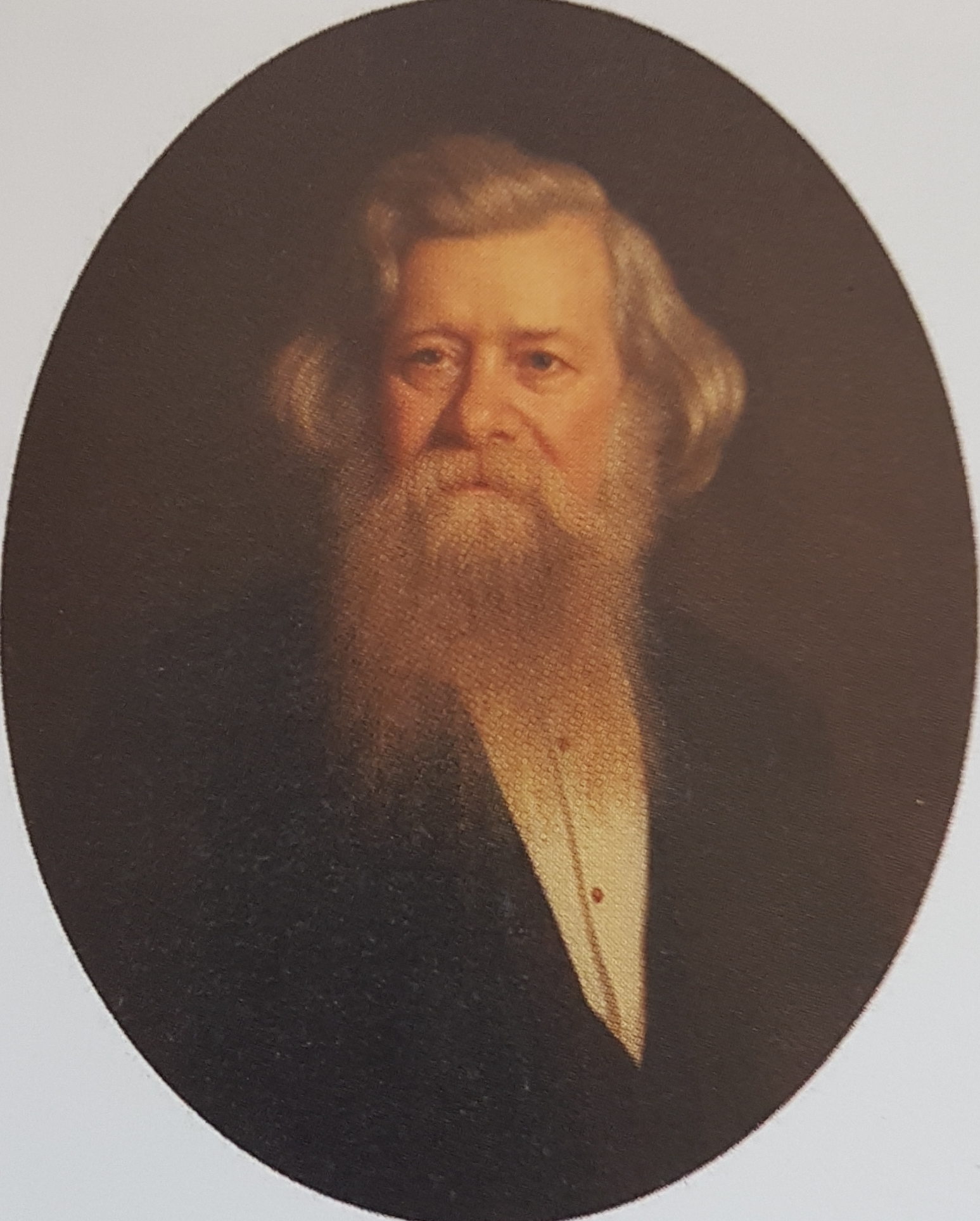
Portrait by Amalia Lindegren

Friedrich Wilhelm Meves (April 14, 1814 – April 9, 1891) was a German naturalist, ornithologist and entomologist. He worked as a curator of birds at the Swedish Museum of Natural History. He experimentally demonstrated cosmetic colouration in lammergeiers and mechanical sound production involved in the drumming displays of snipes.

== Life and work ==
Meves was born in Delligsen, in the duchy of Braunschweig to pastor Ludvig Christian Friedrich and Augusta Wilhelmine née Lüders. Even as a child he took an interest in insects while his mother harvested potatoes. His father died in 1827 and Meves was taken care of by his maternal grandfather pastor Lüders in Braunschweig. At fifteen he went to study pharmacy at Elbengerode am Harz and graduated after a five-year apprenticeship. He continued to study and also observe birds in the field. He went to the University of Kiel in 1840 where he was employed as an amanuens by Friedrich Boie. He then left his pharmacy studies and improved his skills in the preparation of skins and in taxidermic mounts. When Carl Jacob Sundevall visited Kiel in 1841 he offered Meves a position at the Riksmuseum in Stockholm. Meves moved to Sweden in 1842 and worked there until his retirement in 1877. As part of the museum work, he collected extensively across Europe and Russia and published extensively on his findings. He took a special interest in the immature stages of birds and their plumages. He was a founding member of the Stockholm Entomological Society in 1879. Among his major works was a manual of taxidermy that he published in 1882. The African starling Lamprotornis mevesii was named in his honour.

Meves was able to demonstrate using chemical analysis that the reddish coloration of adult lammergeiers and of their outside of the eggs was caused by iron oxide. Meves was also the first to identify the source of the drumming sounds of snipe as the tail feathers. He had observed it first in the field in 1856 but he attached the outer tail feather with a fine thread to a steel wire and attached it to a stick and was able to move it rapidly through the air to recreate the bleating sound.

Meves married Ida Lappe, daughter of Karl Lappe, in 1844 and became a Swedish citizen in 1865. Ida was an active translator of poetry. She died a year before him. He bequeathed his personal collections of birds eggs and butterflies to the Swedish museum. He had no children of his own but adopted a nephew Julius Seelhorst-Meves (1844–1926) who became an entomologist.
