= Geography and climate of Winnipeg =

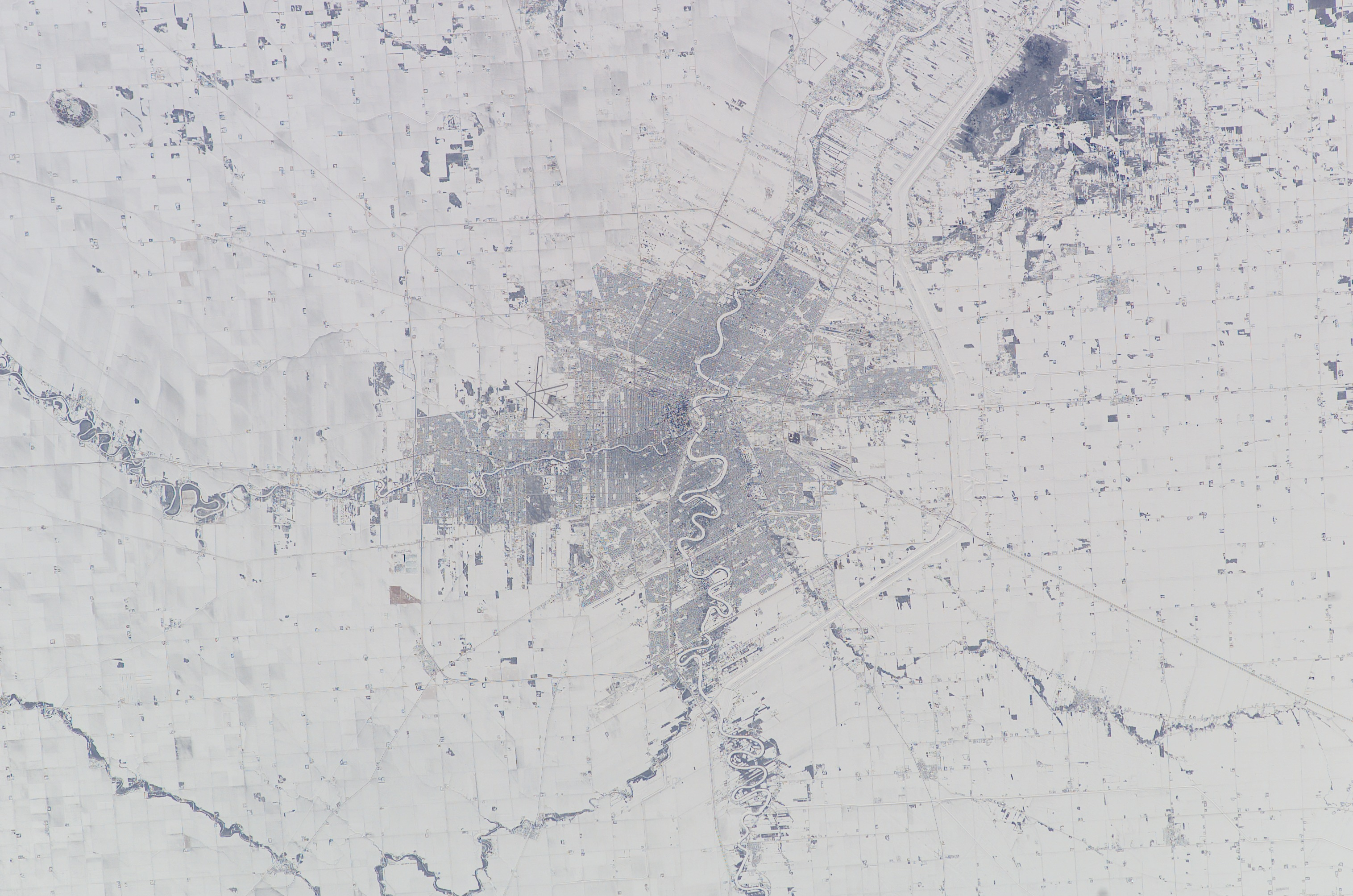
Satellite image of Winnipeg

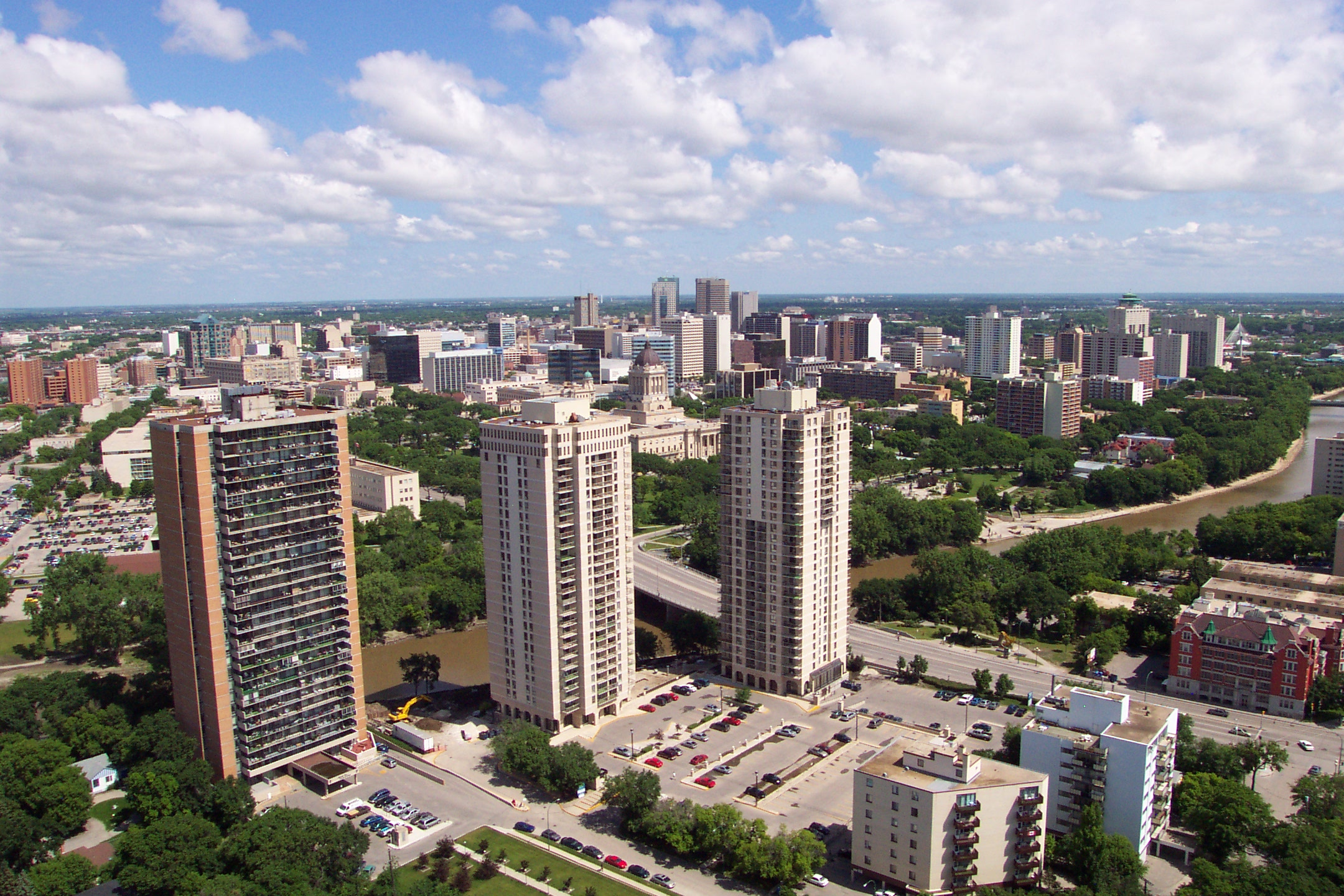
Winnipeg's skyline

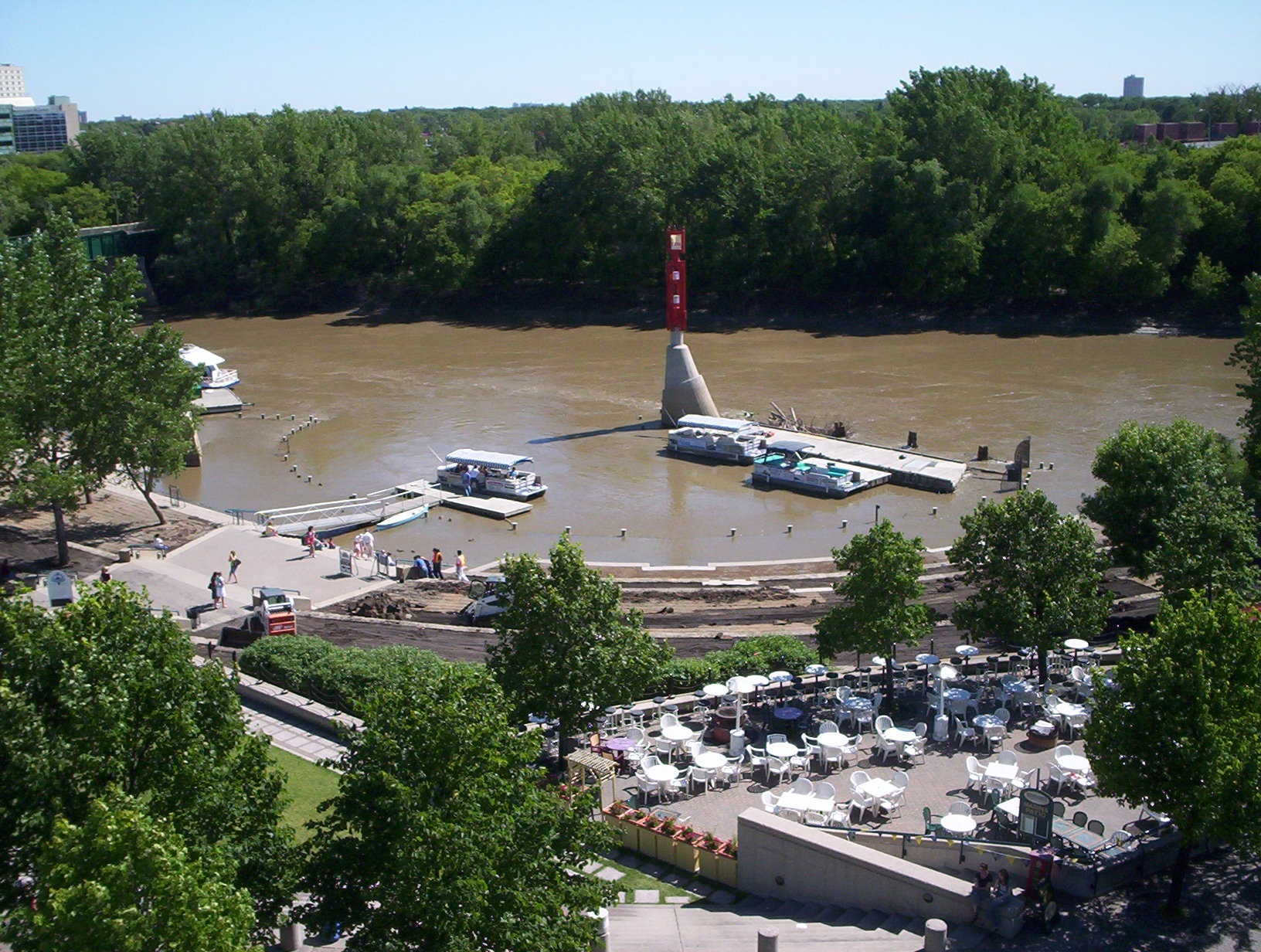
The Forks during the 2005 flood

Winnipeg lies at the bottom of the Red River Valley, a low-lying flood plain with an extremely flat topography. This valley was formed by the ancient glacial Lake Agassiz which has rich deposits of black soil. Winnipeg is on the eastern edge of the Canadian Prairies in Western Canada; it is known as the 'Gateway to the West'. It is relatively close to many large Canadian Shield lakes and parks, as well as Lake Winnipeg (the Earth's twelfth largest freshwater lake). Winnipeg is bordered by tallgrass prairie to the west and south and the aspen parkland to the northeast.

Winnipeg is fairly isolated in that the closest city with equal or greater population is Minneapolis–Saint Paul, Minnesota (metro population of 3,317,308), which is 733 km (455 mi) southeast from the city. According to the Census geographic units of Canada, the city has a total area of 464.01 km^{2} (179.16 sq mi) and an elevation of 240 m (790 ft).

The city has a humid continental climate with wide temperature contrasts between winter and summer, and greater precipitation in summer. Mean January temperature is −16.4 °C (2.5 °F), and mean July temperature is 19.7 °C (67.5 °F). Average annual precipitation is 521.1 mm (20.52 in); snow falls on 53 days and lies on 132 days in an average year.

Winnipeg has three major rivers: the Red River, the Assiniboine River, and the Seine River. The Red River is a Canadian heritage river. Because of Winnipeg's extremely flat topography and substantial snowfall, Winnipeg is subject to severe flooding. The Red River reached its greatest flood height in 1826. The Red River Floodway protects the city from flooding.

== Cityscape ==
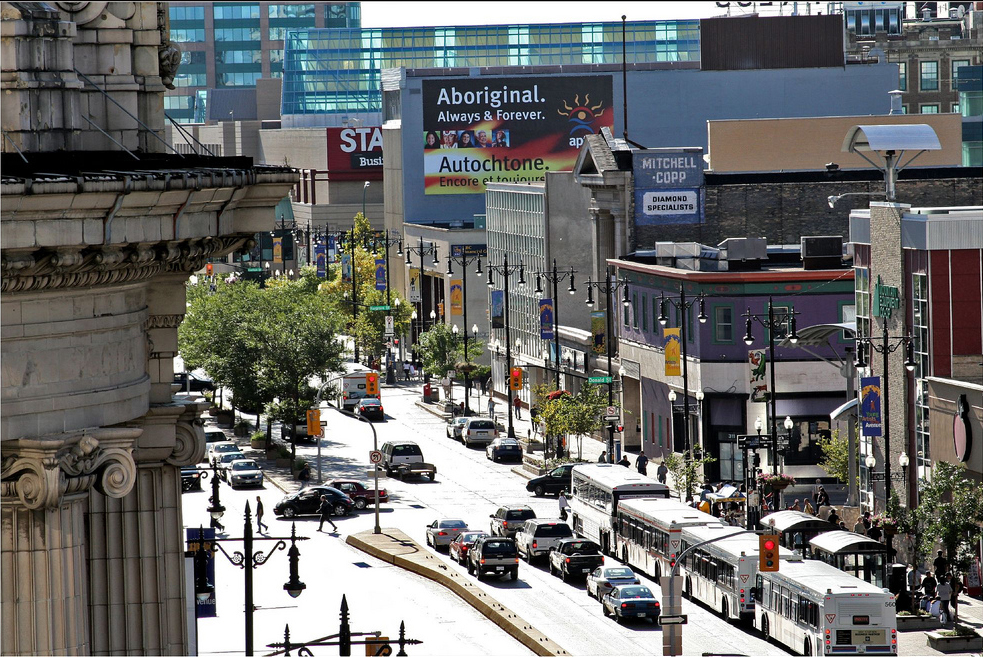
Downtown Winnipeg Portage Avenue

According to the 2001 Census, there are 230 neighbourhoods in Winnipeg. Downtown Winnipeg, the city's economic core, is centred on the intersection of Portage Avenue and Main Street (reputed to be one of the windiest in Canada). Downtown Winnipeg covers an area of about one square mile (2.5 km^{2}) and is the fastest growing high-income neighbourhood in the city. More than 72,000 people work downtown, and over 40,000 students attend classes at its universities and colleges. The past few decades have seen downtown undergo major revitalization efforts; since 1999, over Can$1.2 billion has been invested.

In Winnipeg, there are 10 buildings that stand taller than 85 m (279 ft). The tallest building in the city is the newer 33-storey, 128 m (420 ft) 201 Portage. The second tallest building in the city is the Richardson Building, standing at 124 m (407 ft) tall with 34 storeys.

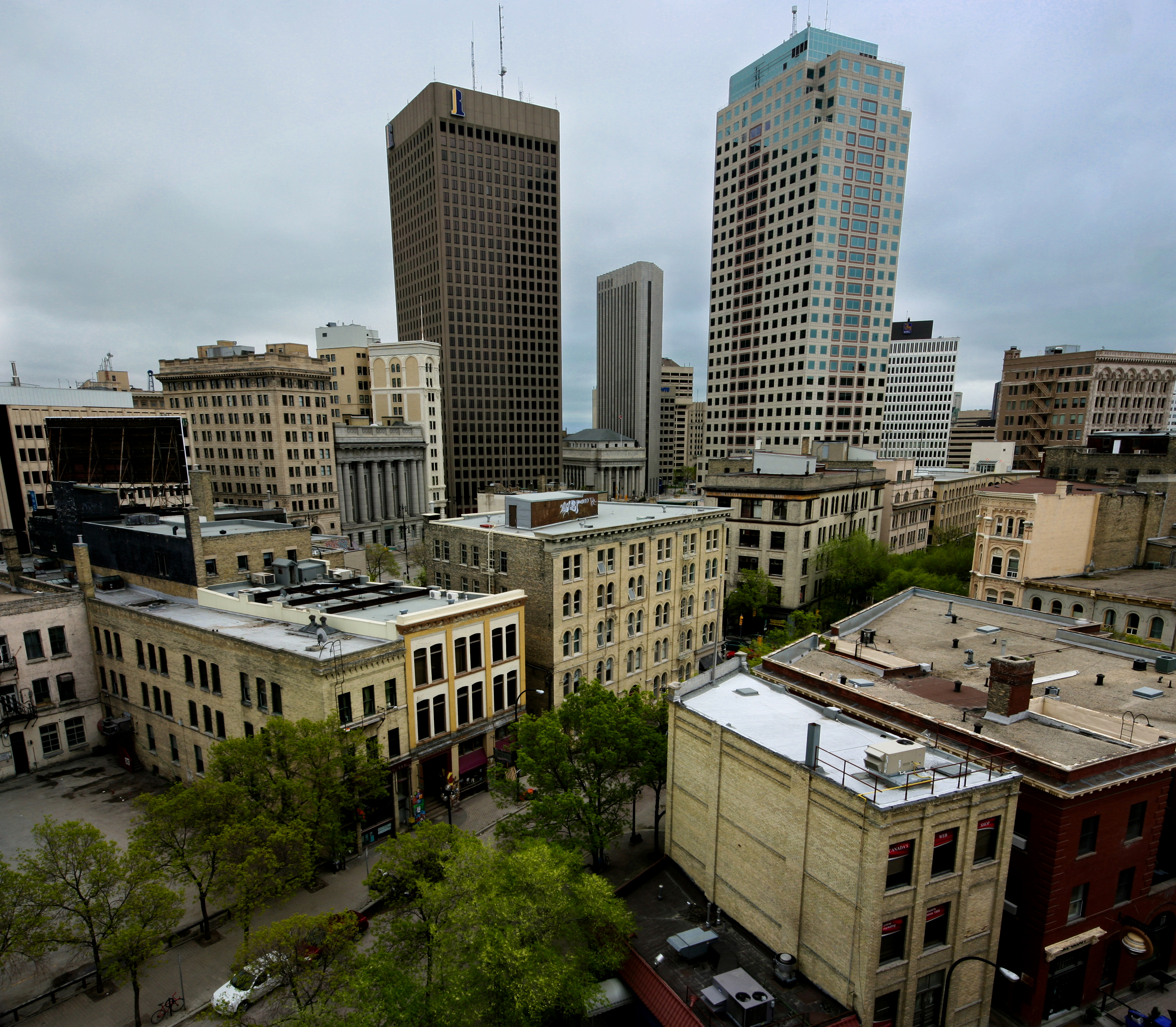
The Exchange District.

Downtown Winnipeg's Exchange District is named after the area's original grain exchange from 1880 to 1913. The 30-block district received National Historic Site of Canada status in 1997; it includes North America's most extensive collection of early 20th-century terracotta and cut stone architecture, 62 of downtown Winnipeg's 86 heritage structures, Stephen Juba Park, and Old Market Square, home to Winnipeg Jazz and Fringe Festivals. Other major downtown areas include The Forks, Central Park, Broadway-Assiniboine and Chinatown. Many of Downtown Winnipeg's major buildings are linked with the Winnipeg Walkway skywalk.

Various residential neighbourhoods surround downtown in all directions, but expansion is greatest to the south and west, and has tended to follow the course of the two major rivers. The urbanized area in Winnipeg is about 25 km (16 mi) from east to west and 20 km (12 mi) from north to south, although several areas remain underdeveloped. The largest park in the city, Assiniboine Park next to the affluent neighbourhood of Tuxedo, houses the Assiniboine Park Zoo and the Leo Mol Sculpture Garden, Other large city parks include Kildonan Park, St. Vital Park, and Fort Whyte Centre. The major commercial areas in the city are Polo Park (West End and St. James), Kildonan Crossing (Transcona and East Kildonan), South St. Vital, and Garden City (West Kildonan).

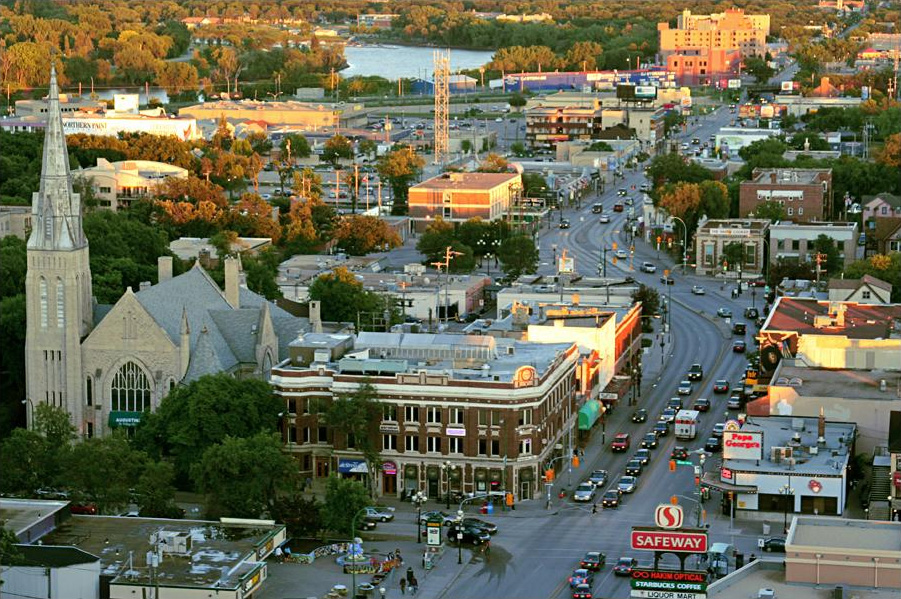
Osborne Village

Osborne Village is Winnipeg's most densely populated neighbourhood, as well as the second most densely populated neighbourhood in Western Canada. It was voted the Best Place to Live in Uptown Magazine's 2008 Best of List. Osborne Village is a complex urban community with a diverse heritage. Popular annual events include the Canada Day Festival. Osborne Village is home to over 175 businesses local businesses.

Saint Boniface is the centre of much of the Franco-Manitoban community. It features such landmarks as the Cathédrale de Saint Boniface (St. Boniface Cathedral), Boulevard Provencher, the Provencher Bridge, Esplanade Riel, St. Boniface Hospital, the Collège universitaire de Saint-Boniface and the Royal Canadian Mint. It covers the southeast part of the city and has a population of 65,000.

=== Roadways and addresses ===
The city uses the grid plan but there are several different grids in place, as the city was originally thirteen separate municipalities and each developed under different circumstances and under different rules. Although it is common for roadways running north–south to be called "streets" and those running east–west to be called "avenues", the practice is far from universal, and few roadways run in a precise cardinal direction; an "east-west" road may run at a 45-degree angle from true east–west. Attempts in the early 20th century to bring order to the system by giving numerical names to the streets failed; all roadways in the city have proper names, some of which are repeated. (There is, for instance, a Wellington Crescent in River Heights and a Wellington Avenue in the West End, and a Killarney Avenue in Fort Garry and a Killarney Street in St. Vital.)

There is also no universal address numbering system in place. Address numbers usually increase as the distance from either the Red or Assiniboine rivers increases, but this is by no means uniform, even within a specific district. These peculiarities can cause serious problems for newcomers and visitors, especially in the older areas of the city, and may even affect postal and other deliveries.

Many of the main thoroughfares in Winnipeg are wide due to the spring soil conditions and the historical use of the Red River ox cart which created wide ruts in the (then) muddy roads. Portage Avenue has four lanes of traffic in each direction plus a central boulevard for much of its run through Winnipeg. Few thoroughfares, however, are as wide as the freeways seen in other Canadian cities (such as the 401 in Toronto or Deerfoot Trail in Calgary). Residential streets are commonly significantly narrower than streets in other Western Canadian cities, so narrow that parking is only possible on one side of the street.

== Climate ==
Winnipeg lies in the middle of the North American continent on a low-lying, flat plain. Due to its location in the Canadian Prairies, and its distance from both mountains and oceans, it has an extreme humid continental climate (Köppen Dfb, Plant Hardiness Zone 3b-4a), in that there are great differences between summer and winter temperatures. The openness of the prairies leaves Winnipeg exposed to numerous weather systems including blizzards and cold Arctic high pressure systems, known as the polar high. Winnipeg has four distinct seasons, with short transitional periods between winter and summer.

The city averages 521.1 mm (20.52 in) of precipitation per year, although this can vary greatly from year to year.

Winnipeg International Airport

Climate chart (precipitation, max. and min. temperature)
J	F	M	A	M	J	J	A	S	O	N	D
18 −11 −21	13 −9 −19	26 −1 −11	33 10 −3	70 18 4	74 23 11	77 26 13	74 25 12	53 20 7	38 10 0	25 0 −9	19 −8 −17
- █ Average max. and min. temperatures in °C
- █ Precipitation totals in mm
- Source: Environment Canada
Imperial conversion
J	F	M	A	M	J	J	A	S	O	N	D
0.7 11 −6	0.5 16 −3	1 30 12	1.3 50 28	2.7 65 40	2.9 74 52	3 78 56	2.9 78 53	2.1 67 44	1.5 51 32	1 32 16	0.8 17 1
- █ Average max. and min. temperatures in °F
- █ Precipitation totals in inches

Climate data for Winnipeg (Winnipeg James Armstrong Richardson International Airport) WMO ID: 71852; coordinates 49°55′N 97°14′W; elevation: 238.7 m (783 ft); 1991–2020 normals, extremes 1872–present (Note: Climate data was recorded at St. John's College from March 1872 to July 1938, and at Winnipeg Airport from January 1938 to present.)
Month	Jan	Feb	Mar	Apr	May	Jun	Jul	Aug	Sep	Oct	Nov	Dec	Year
Record high humidex	6.3	11.1	28.0	34.1	40.2	46.1	48.0	45.5	45.9	34.3	23.9	9.3	48.0
Record high °C (°F)	7.8 (46.0)	11.7 (53.1)	23.7 (74.7)	34.3 (93.7)	37.8 (100.0)	38.3 (100.9)	42.2 (108.0)	40.6 (105.1)	38.8 (101.8)	31.1 (88.0)	23.9 (75.0)	11.7 (53.1)	42.2 (108.0)
Mean maximum °C (°F)	1.8 (35.2)	1.9 (35.4)	9.8 (49.6)	21.9 (71.4)	29.1 (84.4)	31.2 (88.2)	31.5 (88.7)	32.6 (90.7)	29.4 (84.9)	22.5 (72.5)	10.7 (51.3)	2.6 (36.7)	34.0 (93.2)
Mean daily maximum °C (°F)	−11.4 (11.5)	−8.8 (16.2)	−0.9 (30.4)	10.0 (50.0)	18.1 (64.6)	23.3 (73.9)	25.8 (78.4)	25.4 (77.7)	19.6 (67.3)	10.4 (50.7)	0.1 (32.2)	−8.2 (17.2)	8.6 (47.5)
Daily mean °C (°F)	−16.3 (2.7)	−14.1 (6.6)	−6.1 (21.0)	3.8 (38.8)	11.1 (52.0)	17.1 (62.8)	19.5 (67.1)	18.7 (65.7)	13.3 (55.9)	5.1 (41.2)	−4.4 (24.1)	−12.7 (9.1)	2.9 (37.2)
Mean daily minimum °C (°F)	−21.2 (−6.2)	−19.3 (−2.7)	−11.2 (11.8)	−2.5 (27.5)	4.2 (39.6)	10.9 (51.6)	13.2 (55.8)	11.9 (53.4)	6.9 (44.4)	−0.2 (31.6)	−8.8 (16.2)	−17.3 (0.9)	−2.8 (27.0)
Mean minimum °C (°F)	−34.9 (−30.8)	−32.3 (−26.1)	−26.5 (−15.7)	−12.6 (9.3)	−5.6 (21.9)	2.1 (35.8)	6.0 (42.8)	4.7 (40.5)	−2.3 (27.9)	−8.9 (16.0)	−20.8 (−5.4)	−31.1 (−24.0)	−36.0 (−32.8)
Record low °C (°F)	−44.4 (−47.9)	−45.0 (−49.0)	−38.9 (−38.0)	−27.8 (−18.0)	−11.7 (10.9)	−6.1 (21.0)	1.1 (34.0)	−1.1 (30.0)	−8.3 (17.1)	−20.6 (−5.1)	−36.7 (−34.1)	−47.8 (−54.0)	−47.8 (−54.0)
Record low wind chill	−56.4	−57.1	−49.4	−35.8	−20.8	−7.9	0.0	0.0	−11.5	−24.2	−48.1	−50.6	−57.1
Average precipitation mm (inches)	18.0 (0.71)	13.3 (0.52)	25.5 (1.00)	32.5 (1.28)	69.5 (2.74)	74.3 (2.93)	76.6 (3.02)	74.3 (2.93)	53.2 (2.09)	38.1 (1.50)	24.7 (0.97)	19.4 (0.76)	519.2 (20.44)
Average rainfall mm (inches)	0.2 (0.01)	3.8 (0.15)	8.8 (0.35)	19.9 (0.78)	66.2 (2.61)	79.3 (3.12)	89.0 (3.50)	80.9 (3.19)	46.6 (1.83)	33.8 (1.33)	7.2 (0.28)	0.5 (0.02)	436.1 (17.17)
Average snowfall cm (inches)	25.0 (9.8)	11.8 (4.6)	19.2 (7.6)	13.6 (5.4)	4.1 (1.6)	0.0 (0.0)	0.0 (0.0)	0.0 (0.0)	0.0 (0.0)	4.2 (1.7)	21.1 (8.3)	27.2 (10.7)	126.2 (49.7)
Average precipitation days (≥ 0.2 mm)	11.9	8.8	9.1	8.4	12.9	13.4	11.9	11.3	10.7	9.8	9.9	11.6	129.8
Average rainy days (≥ 0.2 mm)	0.47	1.0	2.6	5.3	12.9	13.1	11.9	11.3	10.5	7.2	2.9	0.75	79.9
Average snowy days (≥ 0.2 cm)	12.2	7.8	7.6	3.2	0.82	0.0	0.0	0.0	0.0	2.1	8.7	11.6	53.9
Average relative humidity (%) (at 1500 LST)	72.7	71.0	67.9	49.1	47.8	54.6	55.7	52.3	54.7	61.0	72.6	76.5	61.3
Average dew point °C (°F)	−19.2 (−2.6)	−17.0 (1.4)	−9.4 (15.1)	−3.0 (26.6)	3.6 (38.5)	11.1 (52.0)	14.4 (57.9)	13.0 (55.4)	8.0 (46.4)	0.8 (33.4)	−7.1 (19.2)	−15.1 (4.8)	−1.7 (28.9)
Mean monthly sunshine hours	114.7	133.9	181.9	241.4	285.2	276.3	308.3	281.4	189.0	147.4	93.9	99.5	2,352.9
Percentage possible sunshine	42.9	47.2	49.5	58.6	59.8	56.6	62.6	62.8	49.8	44.1	34.4	39.2	50.6
Source 1: Environment and Climate Change Canada (sun 1981–2010)
Source 2: weatherstats.ca (for dewpoint and monthly/yearly average absolute maximum/minimum temperature)

Climate data is also available for downtown Winnipeg, with a weather station located at The Forks. This data demonstrates the urban heat island effect cities have on moderating temperatures compared to airport weather stations.

The Forks

Climate chart (precipitation, max. and min. temperature)
J	F	M	A	M	J	J	A	S	O	N	D
19 −10 −18	13 −9 −17	28 0 −9	29 10 0	72 18 7	91 23 13	74 27 17	65 25 15	50 20 10	37 11 3	24 1 −6	22 −8 −15
- █ Average max. and min. temperatures in °C
- █ Precipitation totals in mm
- Source: weatherstats.ca
Imperial conversion
J	F	M	A	M	J	J	A	S	O	N	D
0.7 14 0	0.5 17 1	1.1 32 16	1.1 51 31	2.8 64 44	3.6 74 56	2.9 80 62	2.6 78 59	2 68 49	1.4 51 37	0.9 34 21	0.9 18 6
- █ Average max. and min. temperatures in °F
- █ Precipitation totals in inches

Climate data for Winnipeg (The Forks) WMO ID: 71579; coordinates 49°53′18″N 97°07′46″W; elevation: 230.0 m (754.6 ft); (normals 1999-2020, records 1999-present)
Month	Jan	Feb	Mar	Apr	May	Jun	Jul	Aug	Sep	Oct	Nov	Dec	Year
Record high humidex	—	—	27	29	37	45	48	46	41	31	—	—	48
Record high °C (°F)	8.6 (47.5)	9.2 (48.6)	23.2 (73.8)	27.4 (81.3)	36.8 (98.2)	37.4 (99.3)	35.7 (96.3)	36.7 (98.1)	36.2 (97.2)	31.1 (88.0)	19.6 (67.3)	8.0 (46.4)	37.4 (99.3)
Mean maximum °C (°F)	3.3 (37.9)	2.1 (35.8)	10.9 (51.6)	22.1 (71.8)	28.7 (83.7)	31.6 (88.9)	32.5 (90.5)	32.9 (91.2)	30.1 (86.2)	22.8 (73.0)	12.0 (53.6)	3.2 (37.8)	34.3 (93.7)
Mean daily maximum °C (°F)	−10.0 (14.0)	−8.5 (16.7)	0.1 (32.2)	10.3 (50.5)	17.8 (64.0)	23.4 (74.1)	26.7 (80.1)	25.4 (77.7)	19.8 (67.6)	10.5 (50.9)	1.1 (34.0)	−7.6 (18.3)	9.1 (48.3)
Daily mean °C (°F)	−13.8 (7.2)	−12.7 (9.1)	−4.4 (24.1)	5.0 (41.0)	12.3 (54.1)	18.4 (65.1)	21.5 (70.7)	20.0 (68.0)	14.6 (58.3)	6.2 (43.2)	−2.5 (27.5)	−11.1 (12.0)	4.5 (40.1)
Mean daily minimum °C (°F)	−17.9 (−0.2)	−17.2 (1.0)	−9.1 (15.6)	−0.3 (31.5)	6.7 (44.1)	13.2 (55.8)	16.5 (61.7)	14.9 (58.8)	9.7 (49.5)	2.6 (36.7)	−6.0 (21.2)	−14.7 (5.5)	−0.1 (31.8)
Mean minimum °C (°F)	−30.1 (−22.2)	−28.3 (−18.9)	−22.2 (−8.0)	−9.6 (14.7)	−1.5 (29.3)	6.6 (43.9)	10.9 (51.6)	9.3 (48.7)	2.1 (35.8)	−4.9 (23.2)	−15.8 (3.6)	−26.4 (−15.5)	−31.2 (−24.2)
Record low °C (°F)	−35.8 (−32.4)	−33.1 (−27.6)	−32.2 (−26.0)	−17.9 (−0.2)	−6.3 (20.7)	1.8 (35.2)	6.1 (43.0)	3.8 (38.8)	−2.2 (28.0)	−8.7 (16.3)	−24.1 (−11.4)	−32.2 (−26.0)	−35.8 (−32.4)
Record low wind chill	−47	−42	−40	−24	−13	—	—	—	−4	−14	−31	−41	−47
Average precipitation mm (inches)	18.9 (0.74)	13.2 (0.52)	28.2 (1.11)	29.0 (1.14)	71.6 (2.82)	91.0 (3.58)	73.8 (2.91)	65.1 (2.56)	50.4 (1.98)	36.6 (1.44)	23.9 (0.94)	22.4 (0.88)	524.1 (20.62)
Average dew point °C (°F)	−17.1 (1.2)	−16.6 (2.1)	−9.2 (15.4)	−3.7 (25.3)	3.0 (37.4)	10.4 (50.7)	13.8 (56.8)	12.6 (54.7)	8.1 (46.6)	0.7 (33.3)	−6.3 (20.7)	−14.1 (6.6)	−1.5 (29.3)
Source 1: Environment and Climate Change Canada
Source 2: weatherstats.ca

The Forks maximum records:

- Record high temperature of 37.4 °C (99.3 °F) recorded on 19 June 2022
- Record high daily minimum of 25.1 °C (77.2 °F) recorded on 24 July 2007
- Record high dew point of 26.0 °C (78.8 °F) recorded on 4 August 2001
- Most humid month with an average monthly dew point of 15.6 °C (60.1 °F) recorded during July 2024
- Warmest month with an average monthly mean temperature of 24.0 °C (75.2 °F) recorded during July 2012
  - Warmest monthly average daily minimum of 18.8 °C (65.8 °F) recorded during July 2012
  - Warmest monthly average daily maximum of 29.5 °C (85.1 °F) recorded during July 2006
  - July 2020 saw no daily maximum temperature below 23.9 °C (75.0 °F)
  - July 2012 saw no temperature below 14.5 °C (58.1 °F)
  - July 2024 saw no dew point below 8.5 °C (47.3 °F)

For The Forks station, summer 2009 saw the lowest yearly maximum for daily minimum temperatures of 19.6 °C (67.3 °F) as well as the lowest yearly maximum dew point of 20.3 °C (68.5 °F); and summer 2004 for the lowest yearly maximum temperature of 31.4 °C (88.5 °F).

The average yearly maximum daily minimum temperature is 20.4 °C (68.7 °F) for YWG Airport and 22.0 °C (71.6 °F) in The Forks. The average yearly maximum dew point is 23.7 °C (74.7 °F) at YWG airport and 22.9 °C (73.2 °F) in The Forks.

=== Winter ===
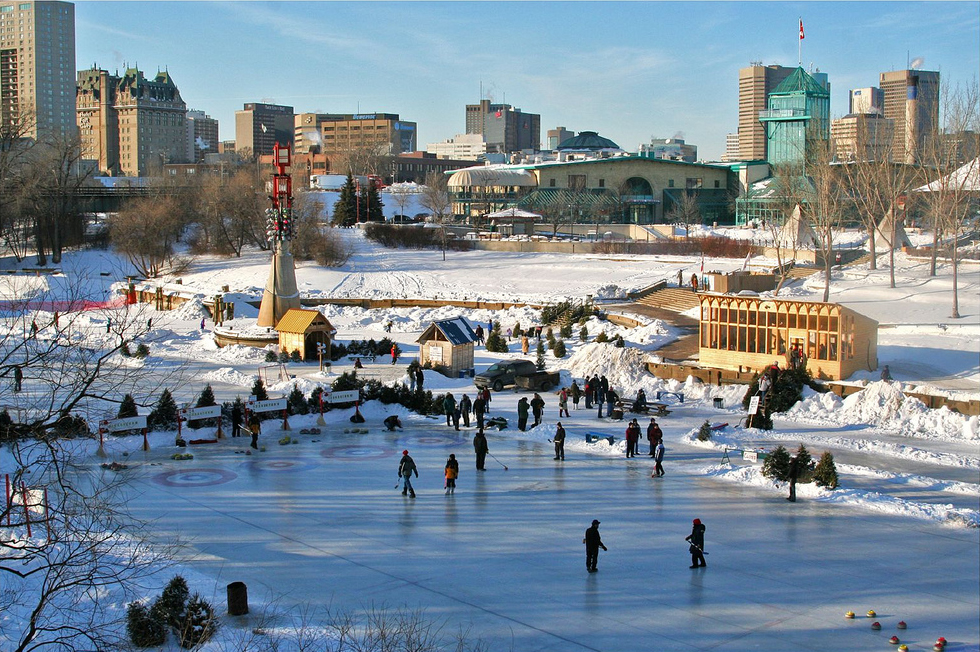
Curling rink on the Red River at The Forks

Typical winter phenomena include the bonspiel (January) thaw, ice fog, and the aurora borealis. The city is virtually assured of having a white Christmas as there is only one 25 December on record in the last century where there was no snow on the ground. Out of Canada's 100 largest cities, Winnipeg's winter is the tenth coldest with an average low of −20.2 °C (−4.4 °F). From December through February the maximum daily temperature exceeds 0 °C (32 °F), on average, for only 10 days and the minimum daily temperature falls below −20 °C (−4 °F) on 49 days. Significant thaws, where the temperature approaches or exceeds 10 °C (50 °F), are practically unheard of in winter.

=== Summer ===
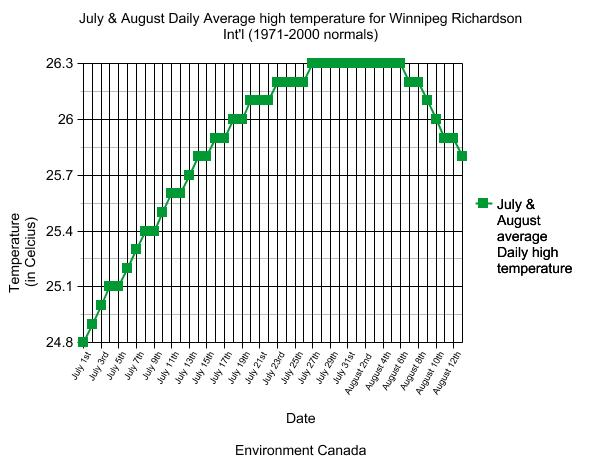
Winnipeg mid-summer climate chart.

Summers are typically warm and generally not overly humid, with average humidity levels around 50% from June to August. Occasionally, humidex readings exceed 40. The trees will usually be in full bloom by late May and do not lose their leaves until early October. Winnipeg's growing season lasts from 25 May to 22 September; and temperatures frequently hover in the mid to high twenties Celsius (77F to 86F). The city frequently gets thunderstorms during the summer, averaging 27 per season. The city can occasionally have short blasts of hot weather like on 23 August 2011 the temperature reached 37.2 °C (99.0 °F). The temperature reaches at or above 30 °C (86 °F) 14 times a year, which is ranked the 16th highest in Canada, just above Toronto, Ontario. The highest temperature ever recorded in Winnipeg (since commencement of record-keeping in 1873) was 42.2 °C (108.0 °F) on 11 July 1936; and the hottest temperature recorded in the past 50 years was 38.7 °C (101.7 °F) on 6 August 1988 and again on 1 August 1989. The highest humidex reading was 48 on 25 July 2007. The record high daily minimum was 28.3 °C (82.9 °F) recorded on 12 July 1936. The record highest dew point was 27.4 °C (81.3 °F) recorded 17 July 2022. The most humid month on record was July 2024 with an average dew point of 16.9 °C (62.4 °F). The warmest month on record was July 2021 with a monthly average mean temperature of 22.7 °C (72.9 °F). August 1983 set the record for the month with the warmest daily maximums with a 29.7 °C (85.5 °F) average, and July 1983 for the month with the warmest daily minimums with a 16.3 °C (61.3 °F) average. July 1964 recorded no daily maximum temperature below 23.3 °C (73.9 °F) for the entire month, and July 1989 for no temperature below 12.7 °C (54.9 °F) for the entire month. July 1989 also saw no dew point below 9.4 °C (48.9 °F) for the entire month. Summer 1994 saw the lowest yearly maximum for daily minimum temperature at 17.3 °C (63.1 °F). Summer 2009 recorded the lowest yearly maximum temperature at 30.5 °C (86.9 °F). Summer 1961 saw the lowest yearly maximum dew point of 20.6 °C (69.1 °F).

=== Spring and autumn ===
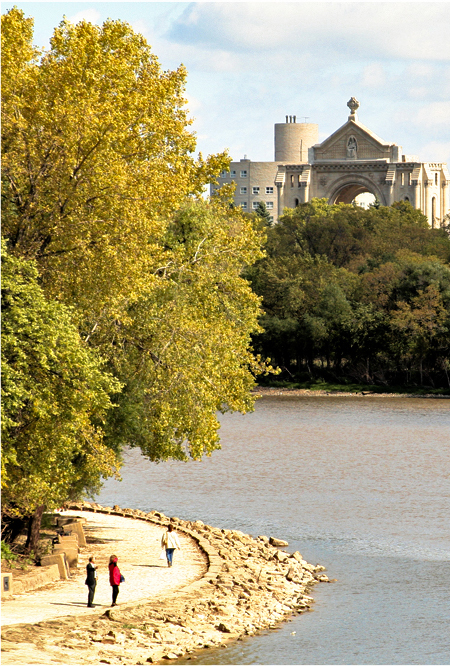
Assiniboine River walkway near The Forks in fall

The weather during these seasons is highly variable, and rapidly changing. For example, temperatures in Winnipeg in April have ranged from −6.3 to 34.3 °C (20.7 to 93.7 °F), and in October from −6 to 30.5 °C (21.2 to 86.9 °F). The city often receives an Indian summer, when summer weather returns briefly after the first frosts, usually in late September or sometimes October. Some Septembers can have gorgeous weather, like in September 2009 Winnipeg only saw 4 days with daytime highs below 20 °C (68 °F) at the Forks weather station.

=== Sunshine ===
Winnipeg is one of Canada's sunniest cities, and the weather in all seasons is characterized by an abundance of sunshine. In July and August combined, Winnipeg has 60 out of 62 days with measurable sunshine; and has an annual average of 306 days a year with measurable sunshine. November is the least sunny month while July and August are the most sunny months. Winnipeg is ranked second for Canada's clearest skies year-round, sixth sunniest city year-round, and second for sunniest city in Canada in spring and winter. Winnipeg is sunnier in the summer, spring, and winter than any Canadian city east of it. Winnipeg has short daylight hours in the winter and long daylight hours in the summer. On the shortest day of the year (21 December) Winnipeg only has 8 hours and 5 minutes of daylight with the sun setting at 4:29pm and doesn't rise until 8:24am. On 21 June (the longest day of the year) Winnipeg has 16 hours and 21 minutes of daylight with twilight ending at 10:25pm and twilight starting at 4:35am.

=== Precipitation ===
Winnipeg has moderate precipitation with 513.7 mm (20.22 in) of precip per year. There is measurable rainfall on 76.9 days throughout the year, and 54.7 days with snowfall. Most of the precipitation occurs in the warmer months, with June being the wettest month and February being the driest. Droughts can take place in the region, however they do not happen as frequently as cities further west like Calgary or Swift Current. During the winter Winnipeg will get precipitation mostly in the form of snow, with 36 days of snow falling from December to February. Even in the winter there is occasional rainfall with 2.5 days on average of rainfall during December to February. Other forms of winter precipitation include ice, sleet, and freezing rain. Snow cover usually lasts from November till March, about 132 days or 36% of the year;. The city frequently gets thunderstorms during the summer, averaging 27 days a year with thunderstorms.

=== Wind ===
Winnipeg has a reputation for being a windy city with the intersection of Portage and Main being called the windiest intersection in Canada; however, Winnipeg is only the 12th windiest city in Canada, just below Hamilton, Ontario. The average annual wind speed is 16.9 km/h (10.5 mph), predominantly from the south but the city has experienced wind gusts of up to 129 km/h (80 mph). April is the windiest month, and July the least windy. Tornadoes do occur in the area, particularly in the late spring and summer months, however they are not frequent. A Fujita scale F5 tornado struck Elie (just 30 km (19 mi) west of Winnipeg) in 2007; this was the strongest tornado ever recorded in Canada.

== Flooding ==
Because of its flat topography and substantial snowfall, Winnipeg is subject to severe flooding. The Red River reached its greatest flood height in 1826, and this event still remains the highest flood stage of the last two hundred years.

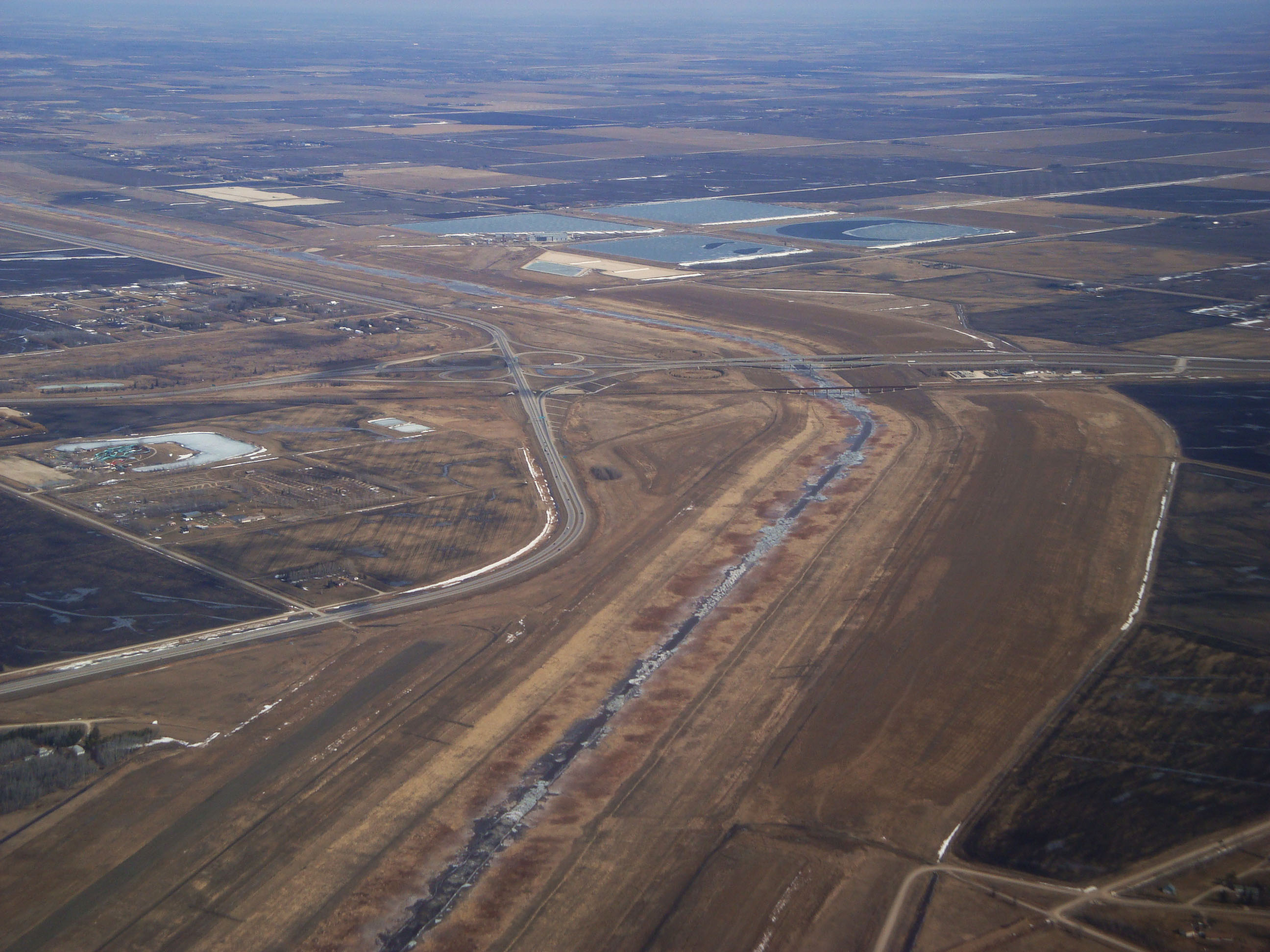
Red River Floodway from the air

A major flood in 1950 caused a State of Emergency to be declared and the Canadian Army was brought in to protect residents and property. Because of the flood, 100,000 residents were evacuated from their homes and approximately 10,000 homes were destroyed, along with many hospitals, schools and businesses. The flood prompted the Government of Manitoba, under former premier Dufferin Roblin, to build the Red River Floodway. The floodway is colloquially referred to as Duff's Ditch, and is a 47 km (29 mi) long diversion channel that protects Winnipeg from flooding.

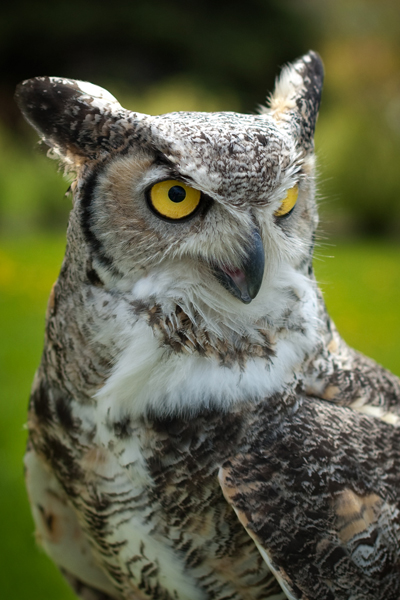
The great horned owl can be found in Winnipeg.

Construction on the floodway project began 6 October 1962 and cost $63 million. The project resulted in excavation of approximately 76.5 million cubic metres of earth. Completed in March 1968, it has successfully prevented over $10 billion in flood damages. The flood control system prevented flooding in 1974 and 1979 when water levels neared record levels. However, in the 1997 Red River flood, water threatened the city's relatively unprotected southwest corner. Flood control dikes were reinforced and raised using sandbags and the threat was averted. Winnipeg suffered limited damage compared to cities without flood control structures, such as Grand Forks, North Dakota.

Other related water diversion projects farther away from Winnipeg include the Portage Diversion (also known as the Assiniboine River Floodway) and the Shellmouth Reservoir.

== Flora and fauna ==
Winnipeg is situated where tall grass prairie meets aspen parkland and is not very far from boreal coniferous forests of the rocky Canadian Shield. The tall grass prairie areas are notable for its endangered western prairie fringed orchid. Some prairie grasses include big bluestem and spear grasses; and wildflowers include aster, goldenrod, prairie crocus and lady's-slipper. Some birds found around Winnipeg include ferruginous and Swainson's hawks; screech and great horned owls; as well as Canada geese and mallards. Winnipeg is also home of the largest remaining mature urban elm forest in North America. Some species of Winnipeg's 8 million trees include elm, ash, maple, oak, poplar, basswood, willow, birch, spruce, pine, cedar, as well as some fruit trees and shrubs. The Red River is the home of a number of species of fish including catfish, goldeye, and walleye.
