= Downtown Winnipeg =

- Neighbourhood
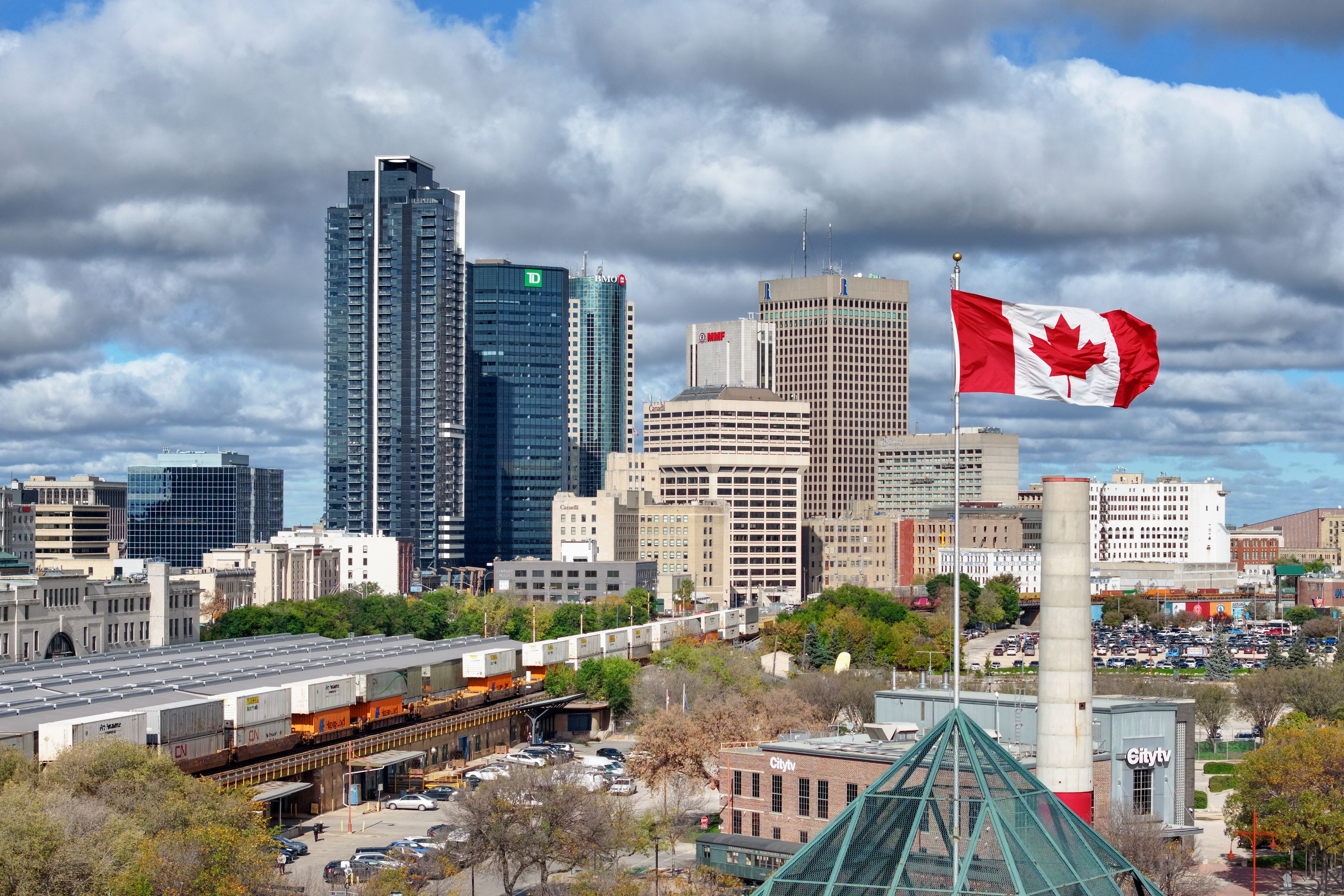
- View of Downtown Winnipeg from The Forks

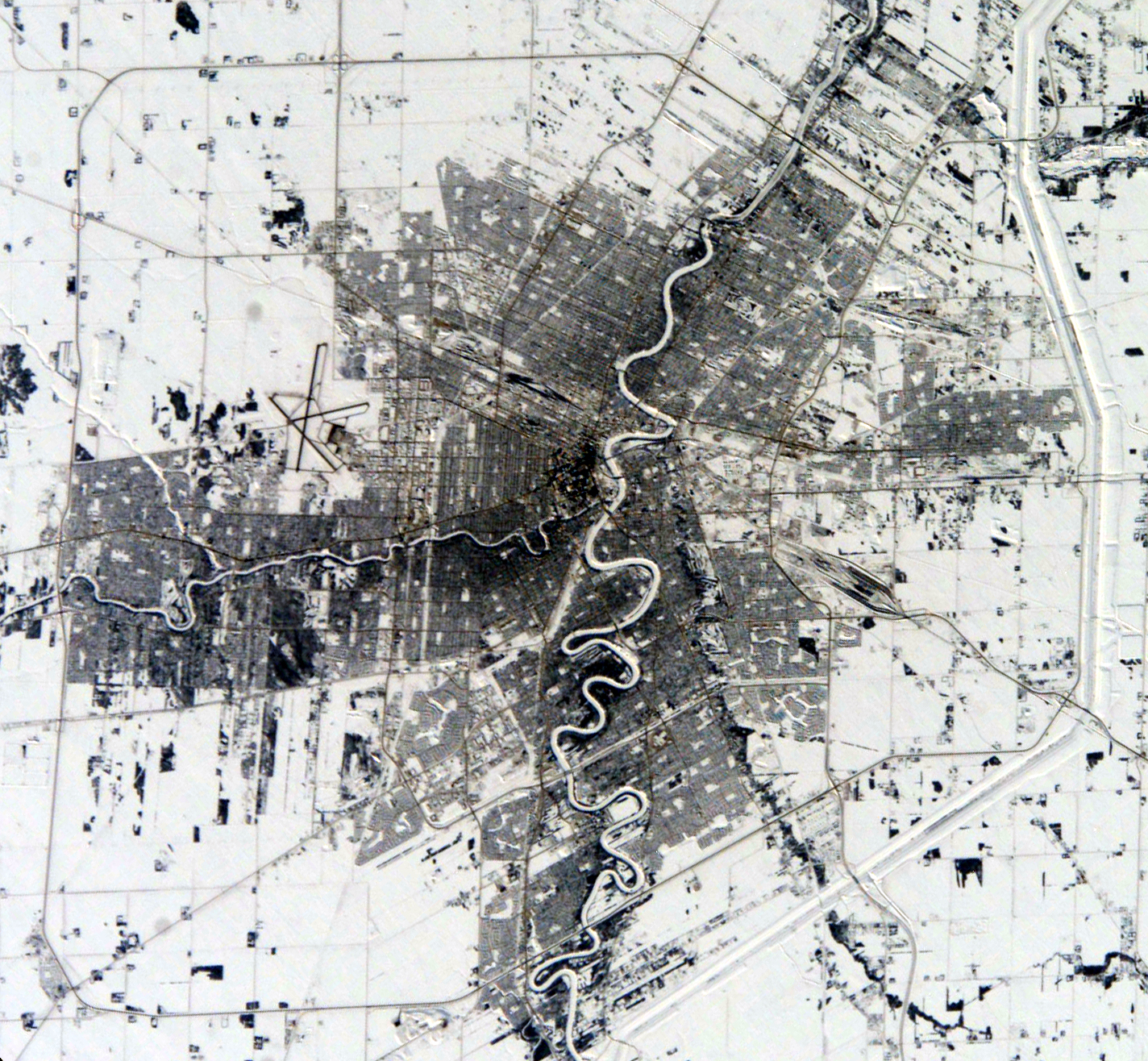
- Location within Winnipeg
- Coordinates: 49°53′44″N 97°8′19″W
- Country: Canada
- Province: Manitoba
- City: Winnipeg

Area
  - Neighbourhood: 16.3 km^{2} (6.3 sq mi)
  - Metro: 5,306.79 km^{2} (2,048.96 sq mi)

Population (2016)
  - Neighbourhood: 66,850
  - Density: 4,095.3/km^{2} (10,607/sq mi)
- Time zone: UTC-6 (Central Standard Time)
  - Summer (DST): UTC-5 (Central Daylight Time)
- Forward sortation areas: R3A, R3B, and R3C
- Area codes: 204, 431

Downtown Winnipeg is an area of Winnipeg located near the confluence of the Red and Assiniboine rivers. It is the oldest urban area in Winnipeg, and is home to the city's commercial core, city hall, the seat of Manitoba's provincial government, and a number of major attractions and institutions.

The City of Winnipeg's official downtown boundaries are: the Canadian Pacific Railway mainline on the north, Gomez Street and the Red River on the east, and the Assiniboine River on the south; the western boundaries of downtown are irregular, following along a number of different streets, back lanes, and across properties. Generally speaking, the western boundaries are rarely much further west of Balmoral and Isabel Streets. In 2016, Canadian Geographic produced a map that generalize Winnipeg's downtown boundaries.

Neighbourhoods in the downtown area include the Exchange District, Central Park, The Forks, and Chinatown. The downtown area is roughly 3 square kilometres (740 acres). Winnipeg Square, Canada Life Centre, Portage Place, and the flagship store of The Bay (closed 30 November 2020) are all located on the downtown section of Portage Avenue. On Main Street are Winnipeg's City Hall, Union Station, and the Manitoba Centennial Centre, which includes the Manitoba Museum, the Planetarium, the Centennial Concert Hall, and the Winnipeg Railway Museum. Although over 60,000 people work downtown, only 17,190 people live in the area covered by the Downtown Zoning By-Law.

There are several residential projects under construction on Waterfront Drive and in the Exchange District, and the residential population of the area is projected to increase substantially in the next few years.

== Neighbourhoods ==
The Downtown Winnipeg Zoning By-Law defines the boundaries of the Downtown planning area, and several sectors within it. The downtown census area is slightly smaller, omitting a three-block extension at the north edge. There is also a significantly larger Downtown community area, used for Community Social Data Strategy for Winnipeg.

=== Waterfront District ===
The Waterfront District is a newly emerging mixed-use development located in the northeast corner of downtown Winnipeg. The district runs along the west bank of the Red River along Waterfront Drive and features Stephen Juba Park.

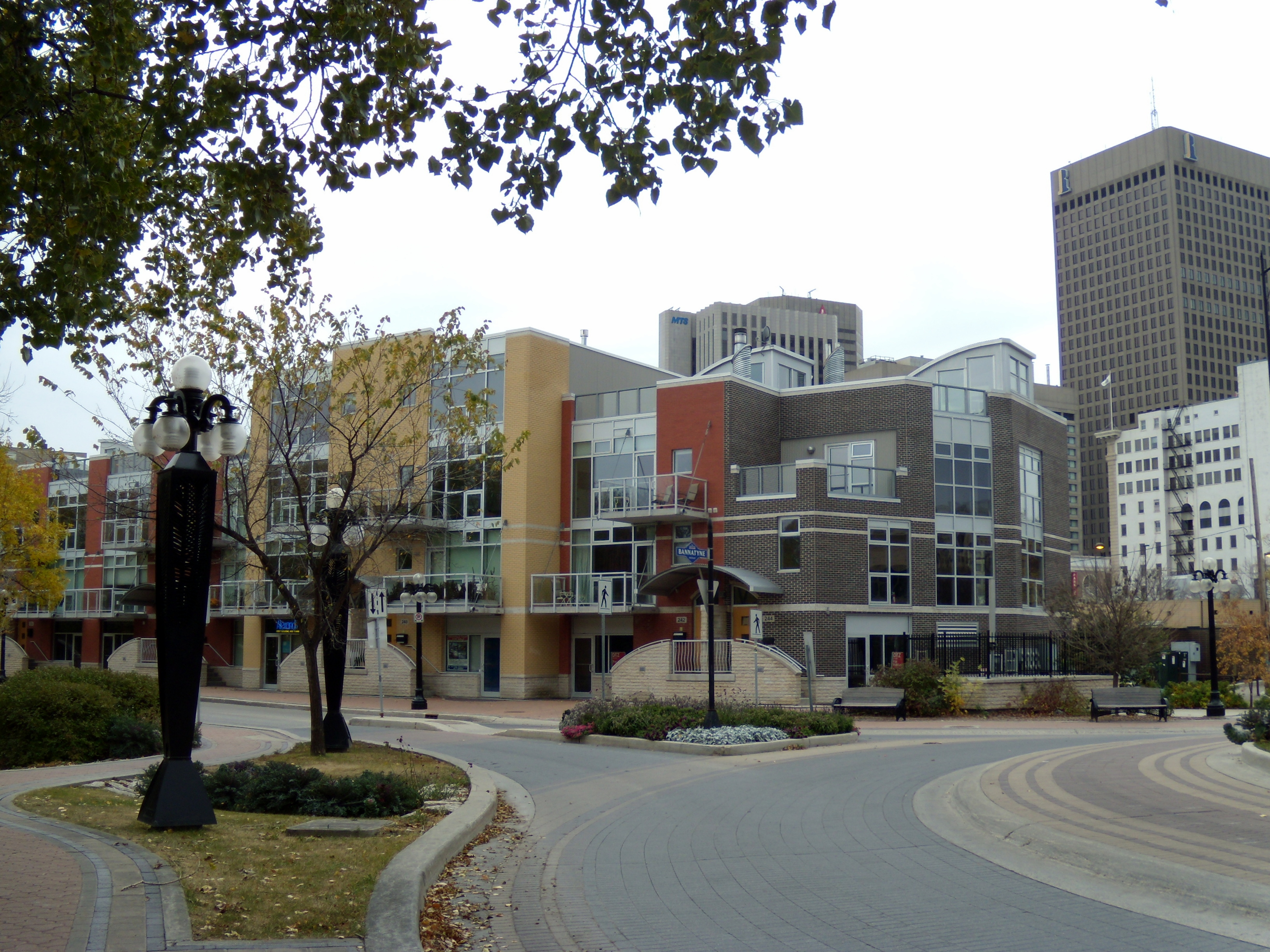
Condominiums in the Waterfront District. The district is situated in the northeast corner of Downtown.

The Waterfront District has seen a number of residential construction projects since 2005. Moreover, there have been plans to extend Waterfront Drive further north, to connect it with the Disraeli Fwy. Developer Leon A. Brown has offered up to 12 properties for redevelopment in the area. Sunstone Boutique Hotels had an $11-million plan to build a three-storey, 67-room boutique hotel on what is now a gravel parking lot, along with a new casual-dining restaurant in the one-storey brick former Harbourmaster's building. The plans also involve construction of a public plaza area at the south end of the property.

The design of the Waterfront District also led to a new road system that included Winnipeg’s first roundabout, at the corner of Bannatyne Avenue and Waterfront Drive.

=== Central Park ===
Central Park is one of Winnipeg's most densely-populated neighbourhoods with 13,755 people per square km according to the 2001 Census. Seventy per cent of all refugees coming to Winnipeg live downtown, in and around the Central Park area. Central Park includes many different ethnicities including Arabs, Vietnamese, Chinese, Ojibway, Filipinos, and African (more than half being African).

=== Exchange District ===
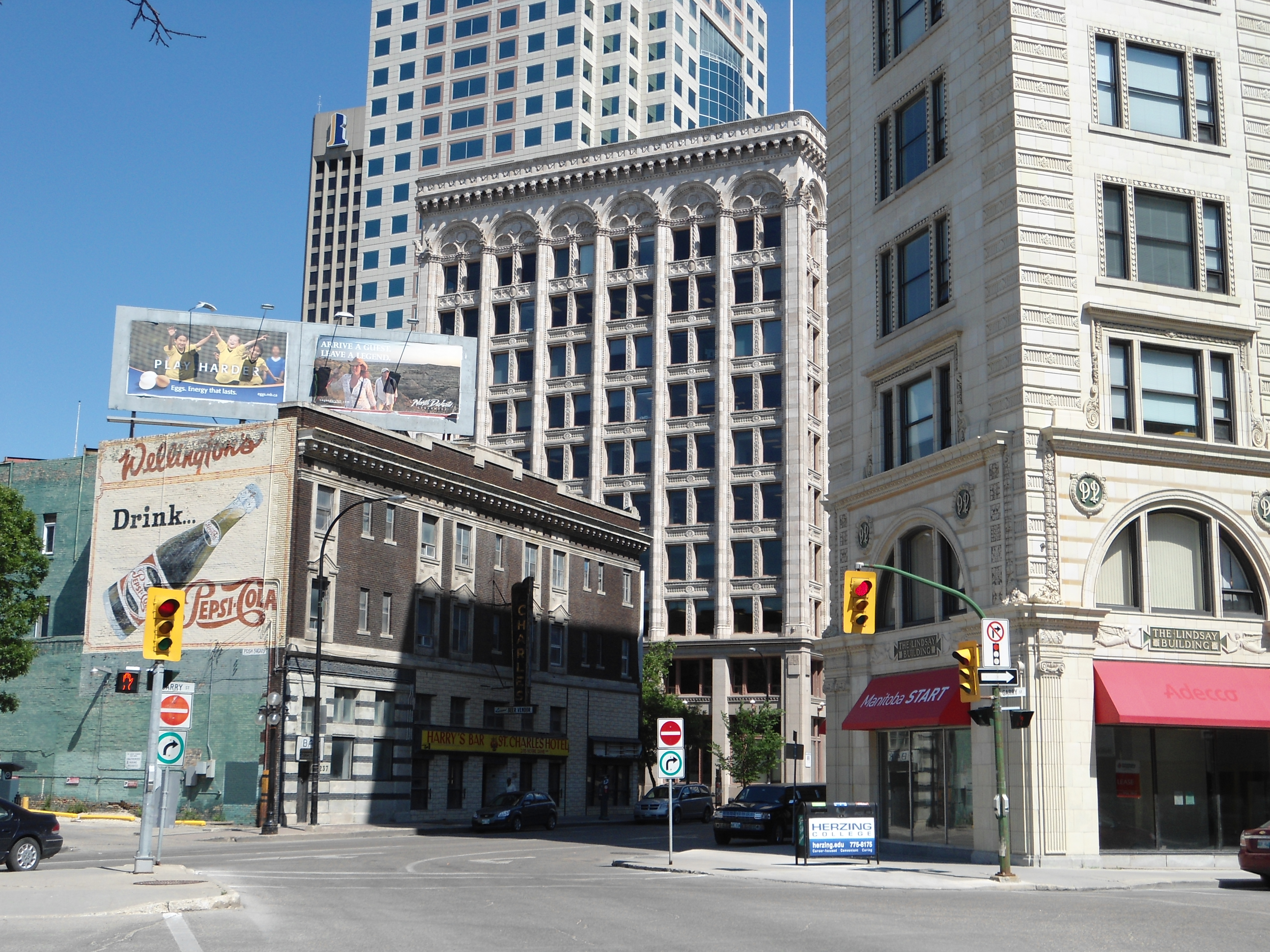
Notre Dame Avenue in the Exchange District, a district in Downtown Winnipeg, and a National Historic Site of Canada.

The Exchange District is a National Historic Site of Canada. Just one block north is one of Canada's most famous intersections, Portage and Main, the Exchange District comprises 20 city blocks and approximately 150 heritage buildings, and it is known for its intact turn-of-the-century collection of warehouses, financial institutions, and early terracotta-clad skyscrapers.

Winnipeg's theatre district is located on the east side of the Exchange District, home to the Royal Manitoba Theatre Centre, and Centennial Concert Hall which houses the Winnipeg Symphony Orchestra, the Royal Winnipeg Ballet, and the Manitoba Opera. The west side of the Exchange is home to Cinematheque, a small movie theatre located in the Artspace building on Albert Street.

The Exchange District's Old Market Square annually hosts the Jazz Winnipeg Festival, the Winnipeg Fringe Theatre Festival, and the Manitoba Electronic Music Exhibition. Renovations to Old Market Square completed in 2012 added "The Cube", a $1.5 million stage, with a skin made up of 20,000 aluminum links. The stage contains a built-in lighting system, green room and two performance levels.

The district is home to Red River College's Roblin Centre and the Paterson GlobalFoods Institute.

=== Broadway-Assiniboine ===
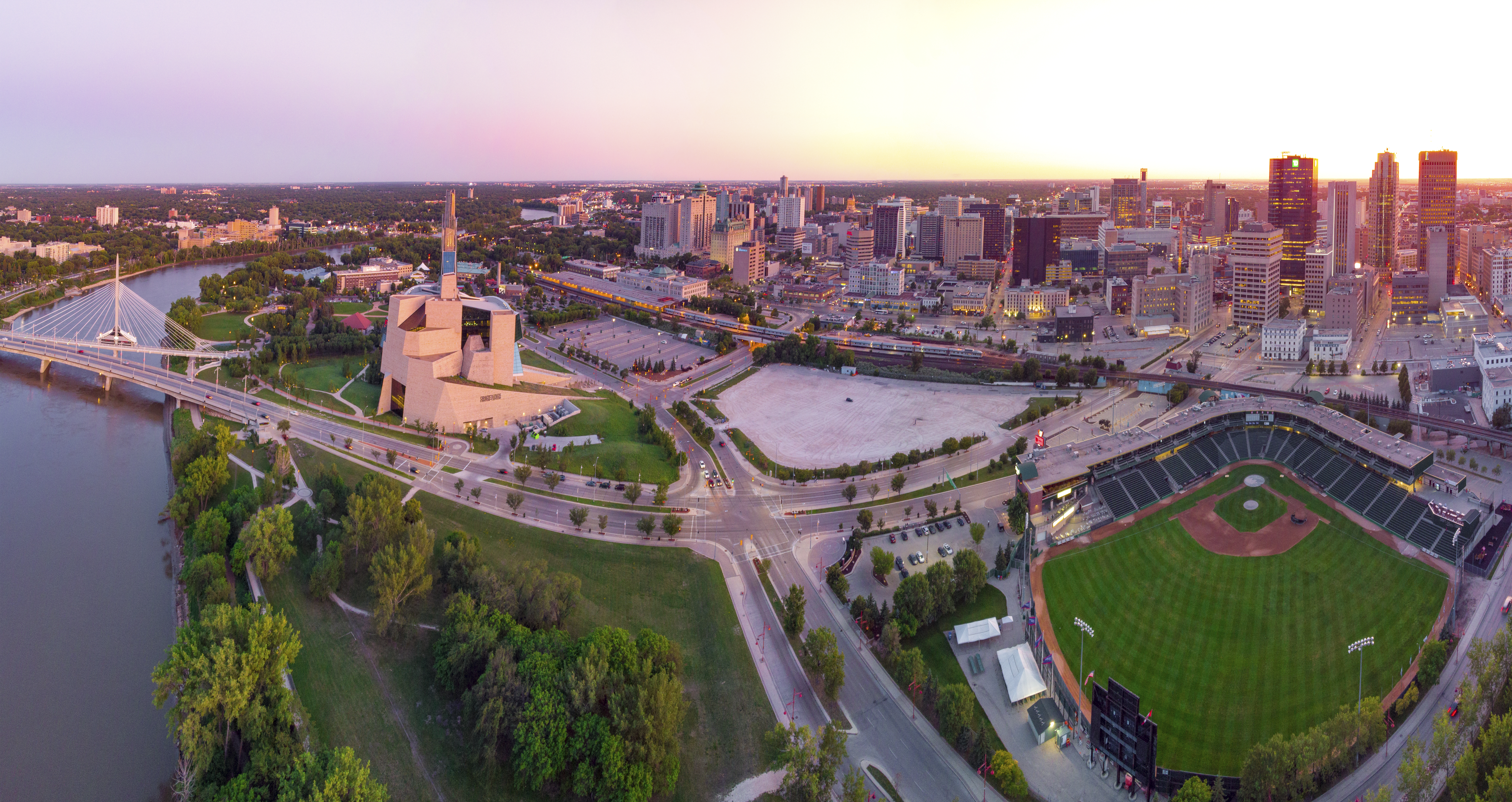
Panorama of Downtown Winnipeg. From left to right: The Forks, Broadway-Assiniboine, South Portage, Portage and Main. (The Exchange and Waterfront districts are located farther to the right and front.)

Broadway-Assiniboine lies in the southern part of downtown on the north bank of the Assiniboine River. The neighbourhood is one of the more densely-populated in Winnipeg, with 15,452.2 people per square kilometre. It features many notable landmarks such as the historic Upper Fort Garry, Hotel Fort Garry, and the Manitoba Legislative Building. Broadway-Assiniboine features the "Assiniboine Riverwalk" and is home to many notable restaurants.

The population of Broadway-Assiniboine was 5,270 as of the 2016 Census. The most common transportation method of the people in South Portage is walking, with 31.8%, more than 6.5 times higher than the overall 4.9% for Winnipeg. The average employment income for the area is just $47,268, which is lower than Winnipeg's average employment income of $61,164.

Current plans are for a new bicycle-pedestrian bridge to connect McFadyen Park with Fort Rouge Park over the Assiniboine River. The bridge would be partly financed by a grant from the Winnipeg Foundation. There are three designs vying for final approval.

=== The Forks ===
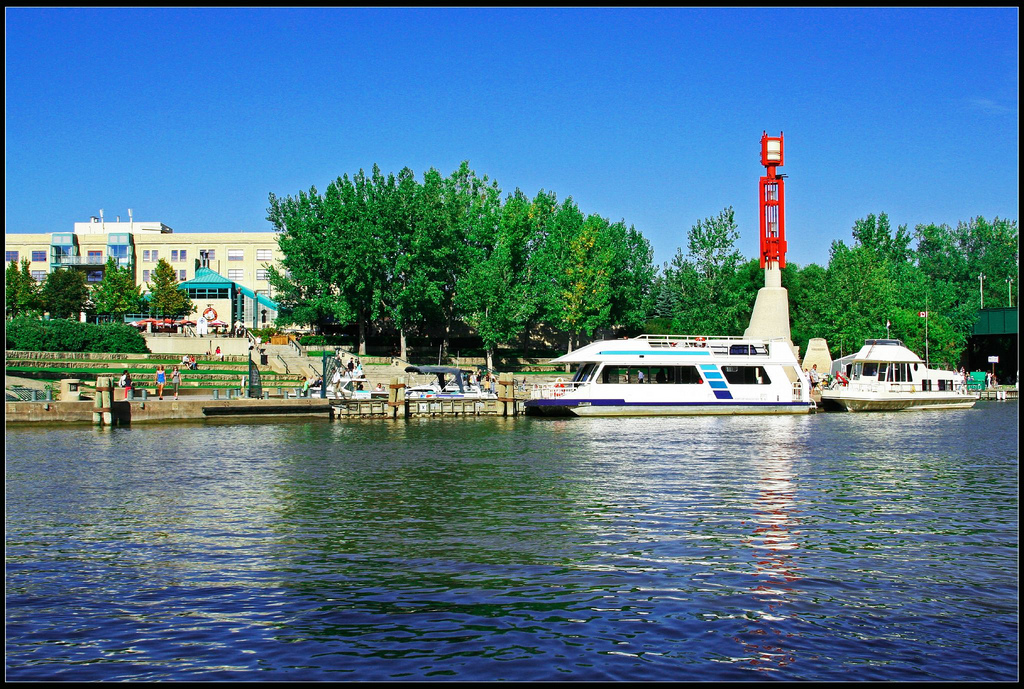
The Forks is a historic site, and public space in Downtown Winnipeg at the confluence of the Red and Assiniboine River.

The Forks is a 99-acre (40 ha) national historic, recreational, cultural, and entertainment area site in downtown Winnipeg, deriving its name from being located where the Assiniboine and Red Rivers meet. The Forks was designated a National Historic Site of Canada in 1974 due to its status as a cultural landscape that had borne witness to six thousand years of human activity.

=== South Portage ===
South Portage is the group of city blocks located between Portage Avenue, Main Street, Broadway, and Memorial Boulevard.

The population of South Portage was 1,865 as of the 2016 Census. The most common transportation method of the people in South Portage is walking, with 42.4%, more than five times higher than the overall 4.9% for Winnipeg. The average employment income for the area is just $52,267, which is lower than Winnipeg's average employment income of $61,164.

South Portage is the location of the main branch of the Winnipeg Public Library system, the Millennium Library.

The area also has the Winnipeg Convention Centre with 160,000 sq ft (15,000 m^{2}) of meeting, exhibition and banquet space. Lakeview Square, the largest mixed-use development downtown in the 1970s, was constructed at the same time as the Convention Centre and completed in 1974.

Opened in 2004, the Bell MTS Place is located just south of Portage Avenue and is home to the Winnipeg Jets.

The area also has the Norquay Building, the Law Courts, Cityplace mall, and VJ's Drive Inn. There are numerous office buildings and hotels in this area, including some of Winnipeg's tallest buildings.

A 42-storey apartment building, 300 Main, is currently being built by Artis REIT, owners of 360 Main St. and Winnipeg Square. When completed, it will be the tallest apartment block in the city.

Winnipeg's public transit hub is located on the Graham Avenue Transit Mall, as many bus routes converge there.

=== Chinatown ===
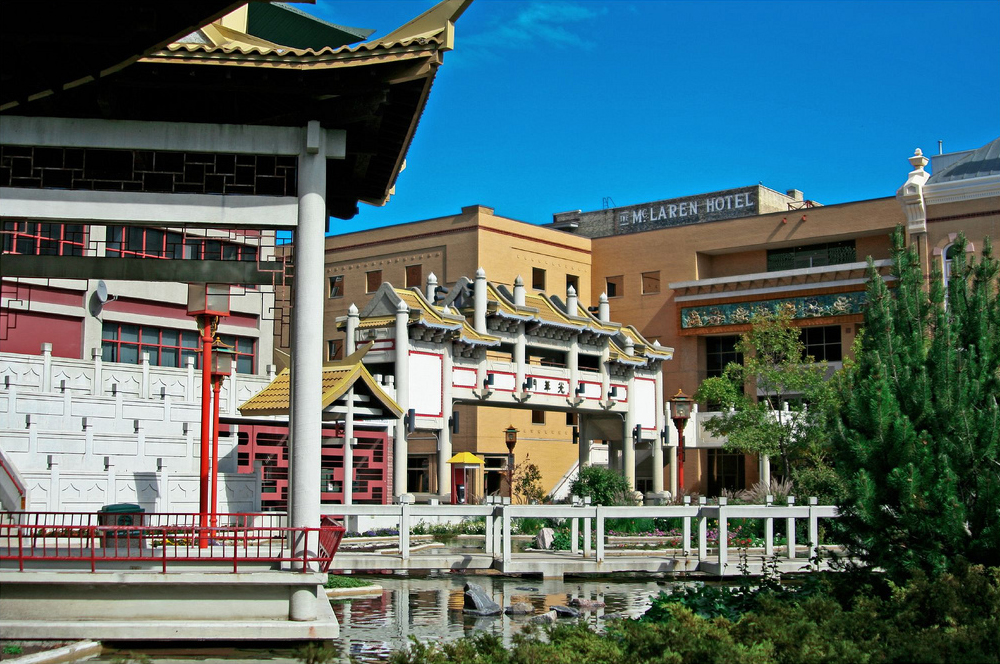
Formed in 1909, Chinatown is an ethnic enclave located in Downtown Winnipeg.

Formed in 1909, the area is home to many shops and restaurants including Asian grocery stores and an herbal products store.

Winnipeg's Chinatown covers 0.1 square kilometres (0.039 sq mi) northwest of City Hall and is home to about 600 people, of whom 90% are in the Chinese visible minority group. 40.5% of the area's residents speak neither English nor French (as compared to 1% of Winnipeg as a whole), while 71.1% of residents speak some variant of Chinese (including Cantonese, Mandarin and Chinese not otherwise specified).

== River crossings ==
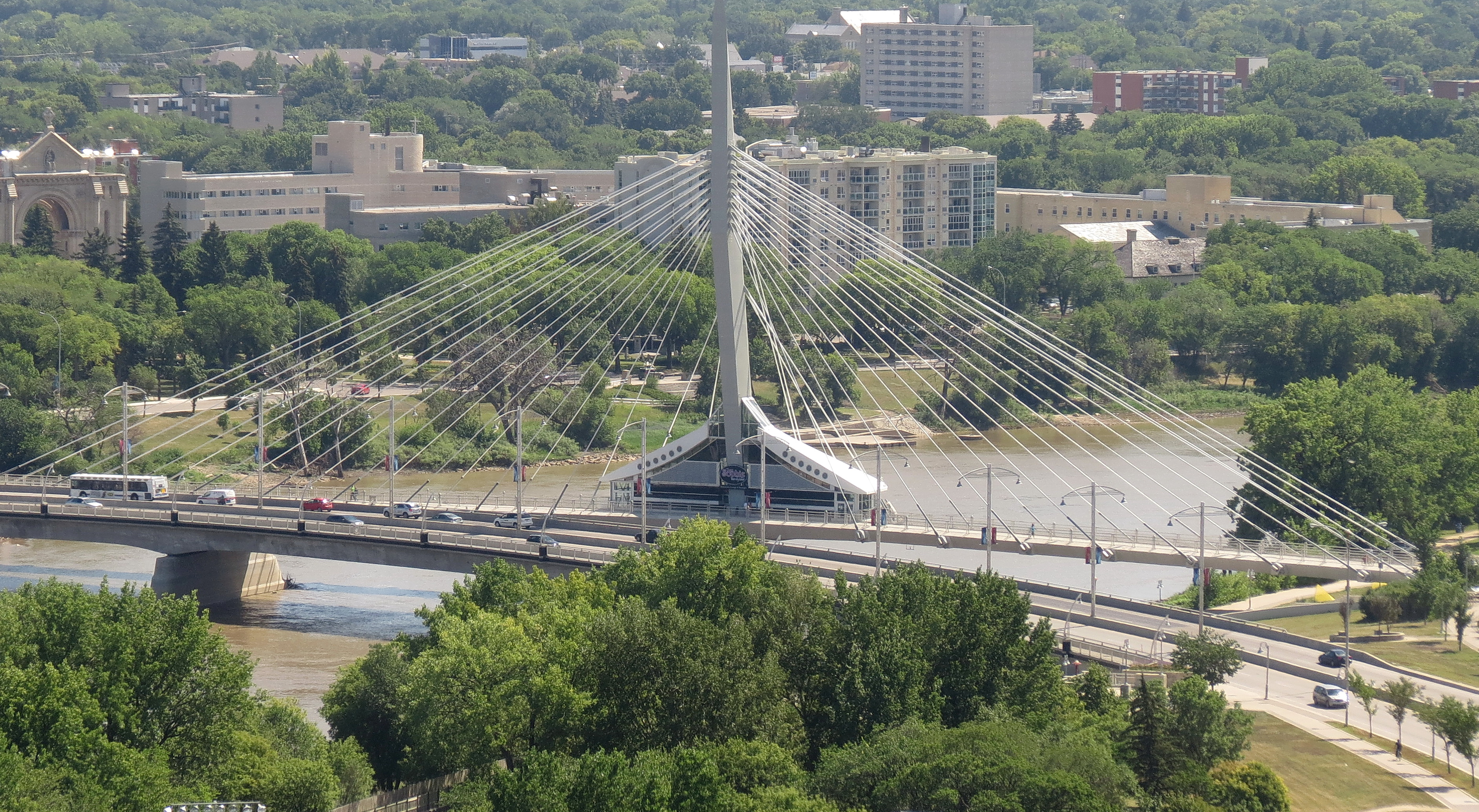
Esplanade Riel

Downtown Winnipeg has four bridges that directly connect to other Winnipeg neighbourhoods or suburbs across the Red and Assiniboine Rivers. They are the Main Street Bridge, Midtown Bridge, Osborne Street Bridge, and the Provencher Bridge.

One of the first bridges in Winnipeg was the Main-Norwood Bridge. It carries traffic between St. Boniface, St. Vital, and points east from Marion Street. Originally a toll bridge, it carried Winnipeg's first horse-drawn streetcars between downtown and River Avenue in the early 1880s.

Osborne Street Bridge connects Osborne Village to the downtown core. The first iteration was built in the late 1880s. In the 2010s the bridge was upgraded with a lit wall using LED technology.

The Midtown Bridge carries traffic to and from south Winnipeg. It was first opened in September 1955. The Bridge sees upwards of 59,300 vehicles average weekdays.

The Provencher Bridge is the third one built. The first version, called the Broadway Bridge, was not engineered correctly and fell into the Red River four days after opening due to ice jams colliding with it. The second version outlived its usefulness and was replaced in the 2000s. The new Provencher Bridge opened to vehicular traffic in December 2003. Located adjacent to the Provencher Bridge is the cable-stayed pedestrian and cycling bridge, Esplanade Riel, opened in 2004. It features space for an indoor restaurant.

== Other features ==
=== Sports venues ===
There are two major sports venues located downtown, Canada Life Centre where the NHL's Winnipeg Jets and Manitoba Moose have played since 2004; and Blue Cross Park, where the American Association's Winnipeg Goldeyes baseball team have played since 1999.

=== Winnipeg Walkway System ===
The Winnipeg Walkway system, popularly known as the Winnipeg Skywalk, is a network of pedestrian skyways and tunnels connecting a significant portion of the city centre.

=== Media ===
Several media organizations have broadcasting studio located in the downtown area, including television stations CTV, Global, Citytv, and Canadian specialty channel APTN; and radio stations QX-104, and 93.7 Nostalgia FM.

The television broadcast antennas for CBC Manitoba and ICI Radio-Canada Manitoba are located on the Richardson Building, while Global TV Winnipeg is located on top of 201 Portage Avenue.

Border Crossings, an internationally known arts magazine featuring Canadian art, publishes from offices in the Exchange District. Where Winnipeg magazine features listings of things to do in Winnipeg and is also published from the Exchange District.

=== Education ===
Isbister School is an Adult Education Centre operated by the Winnipeg School Division in the north Portage Avenue area. Other private schools serve business needs, such as CDI and Booth University College.

== See also ==
- List of tallest buildings in Winnipeg
