= Chinatown, Winnipeg =

Coordinates: 49.904°N 97.140°W

- Neighbourhood
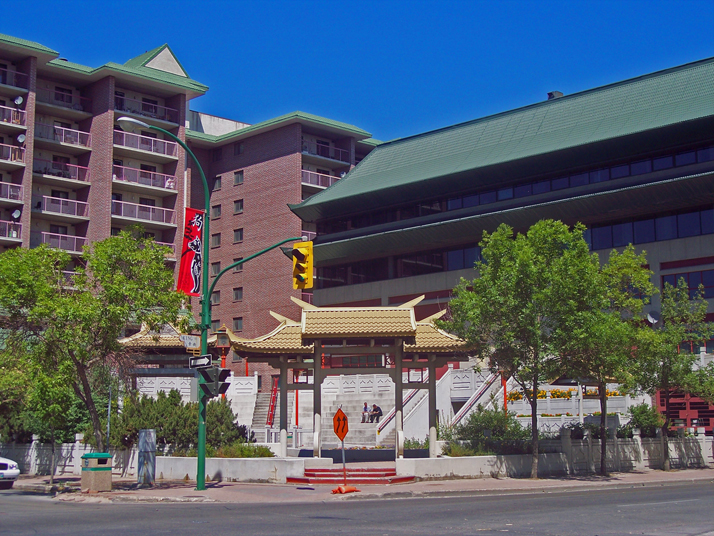
- Chinese Cultural Centre in Winnipeg's Chinatown
- Interactive map of Chinatown, Winnipeg
- Country: Canada
- Province: Manitoba
- City: Winnipeg

Area
  - Total: 0.1 km^{2} (0.039 sq mi)

Chinatown is a neighbourhood in Winnipeg, Manitoba, that was formed in 1909 and serves as an enclave of Chinese expatriates.

Located on King Street between James and Higgins Avenues, adjacent to the Exchange District, it was officially recognized in 1968. Winnipeg's Chinatown is home to many shops and restaurants, including Asian grocery stores and an herbal products store.

In more recent years, as of 2021, a newer de facto Chinatown in the city's Fort Richmond area has seen more Chinese-Canadian businesses open every year.

== History ==
=== 19th century ===
Winnipeg's earliest documented Chinese residents were Charley Yam, Fung Quong, and an unnamed woman who came from the United States in 1877. After the completion of the first phase of the Canadian Pacific Railway (CPR) line in 1885, hundreds of Chinese began to settle the Prairies. Also in 1885, nearly all immigrants of Chinese descent were required by the Chinese Immigration Act to pay a head tax of $50. By 1886, the Chinese community had opened 8 laundries.

At this time, most Chinese arrivals originated from Chenshan Village in Heshan County, Guangdong Province. They tried preventing non-Heshan people from settling in Winnipeg by ambushing non-Heshan people at the railway station, assaulting them, and forcing them to continue heading eastward. In consequence, an undetermined number of Chinese immigrants who were originally headed to Winnipeg, ended up in Fort William and other eastern cities. At times, those who settled in Fort William returned in groups to Winnipeg to assault the Heshan people there. This conflict, among other things, development for a Chinatown in Winnipeg did not make headway for several years. In addition, by 1900, the federal head tax had risen to $100, and three years later to $500.

=== 20th century ===
In 1909, a handful of Chinese stores were established on King Street between Pacific and Alexander Avenues, a few blocks north of Winnipeg’s city hall and market square. By 1910, a small cluster of Chinese businesses began to develop, and the Chinese population increased 5 times by 1911 compared to the 109 Chinese residents in 1901. It developed just outside the core of the central business district, Exchange District.

During the decade of the 1910s, various organizations were founded in Chinatown, including the Chee Kung Tong, the Chinese Nationalist League (or Kuomintang), the Chinese Empire Reform Association, and the Chinese Benevolent Association, as well as various clan associations such as Gee How Oak Tin Association. The Chinese Christian Association, established on Logan Avenue, organized services and English language classes for Chinese residents.

By 1919, Winnipeg had the 5th-largest Chinatown and Chinese community in Canada, with 900 men and a handful of women. In 1921, Chinatown covered 6 city blocks bounded by Princess and Main streets, and Logan and Rupert avenues, with King Street as its main business street. Around one-third of the 800 to 900 Chinese people in Winnipeg worked in the city’s 300 laundries, while the remaining two-thirds worked as cooks, domestic servants, or labourers.

In 1923, the 1885 Chinese Immigration Act was revised to exclude virtually all Chinese from entering Canada, and was colloquially known as the Chinese Exclusion Act. Until it was repealed in 1947, few wives and children had been able to join husbands and fathers in Canada.

By 1970, an increasing number of middle-class Chinese families began moving out of Chinatown. Moreover, urban renewal projects were occurring nearby, including the Disraeli Freeway and a new civic centre and concert hall on Main Street. Not wanting to see the destruction of their neighbourhood, the community of Chinatown formed the Chinatown Development Corporation in 1971 to create a large-scale development plan for Chinatown. In 1981, Joseph Du and Philip Lee successfully lobbied Mayor Bill Norrie, the Manitoba government, and federal ministers to revitalize Chinatown with the construction of the Dynasty Building, Mandarin Building, housing complex, and the Chinatown gate. The Winnipeg Chinatown Corporation was subsequently established that year, followed in 1983 by the Winnipeg Chinese Cultural and Community Centre being incorporated as part the overall development project.

The Winnipeg Chinatown Non-Profit Housing Corporation (CNHC) was established for the construction of the Harmony Mansion, which officially opened on 13 September 1986. The Dynasty Building and the Mandarin Building were completed in 1987.

Since 1987, much of Winnipeg's Chinese population has migrated to a stretch of Pembina Highway, between the Perimeter and Abinojii Mikanah. Approximately 25% of Winnipeg's 12,700-strong Chinese-Canadian community live in a cluster of neighbourhoods in south Fort Garry, while downtown's historic Chinatown is now home to 3% of the city's Chinese-Canadian population.

=== 21st century ===
Started in 2009 as a way to commemorate the centennial of Winnipeg's Chinatown, a yearly street festival called the Chinatown Street Festival has been held in the neighbourhood. The festival features traditional dancing, singing, martial arts, food and a merchant market. In 2011, the two-day festival expanded to include First Nations and African dance groups, as well as the Winnipeg Symphony Orchestra.

In 2011, a new affordable housing project was announced for Chinatown, called the Peace Tower. Costing an estimated $12.7 million, the project was planned to see the construction of a 48-unit, 7-storey apartment complex to be built at Princess Street and Logan Avenue. Construction of the tower began in June 2011; in December, the building at 271 - 273 Princess, known to most as Ham 'n Eggs Grill, was demolished as part of the project. The first tenants moved into the building in spring 2013.

In November 2012, the Shanghai Restaurant was demolished in preparation of the building of the Peace Tower. Built in 1885, the building briefly housed Winnipeg's City Hall in the 1880s. The new building opened June 2013.

In more recent years, as of 2021, a newer de facto Chinatown in the city's Fort Richmond area has seen more Chinese-Canadian businesses open every year.

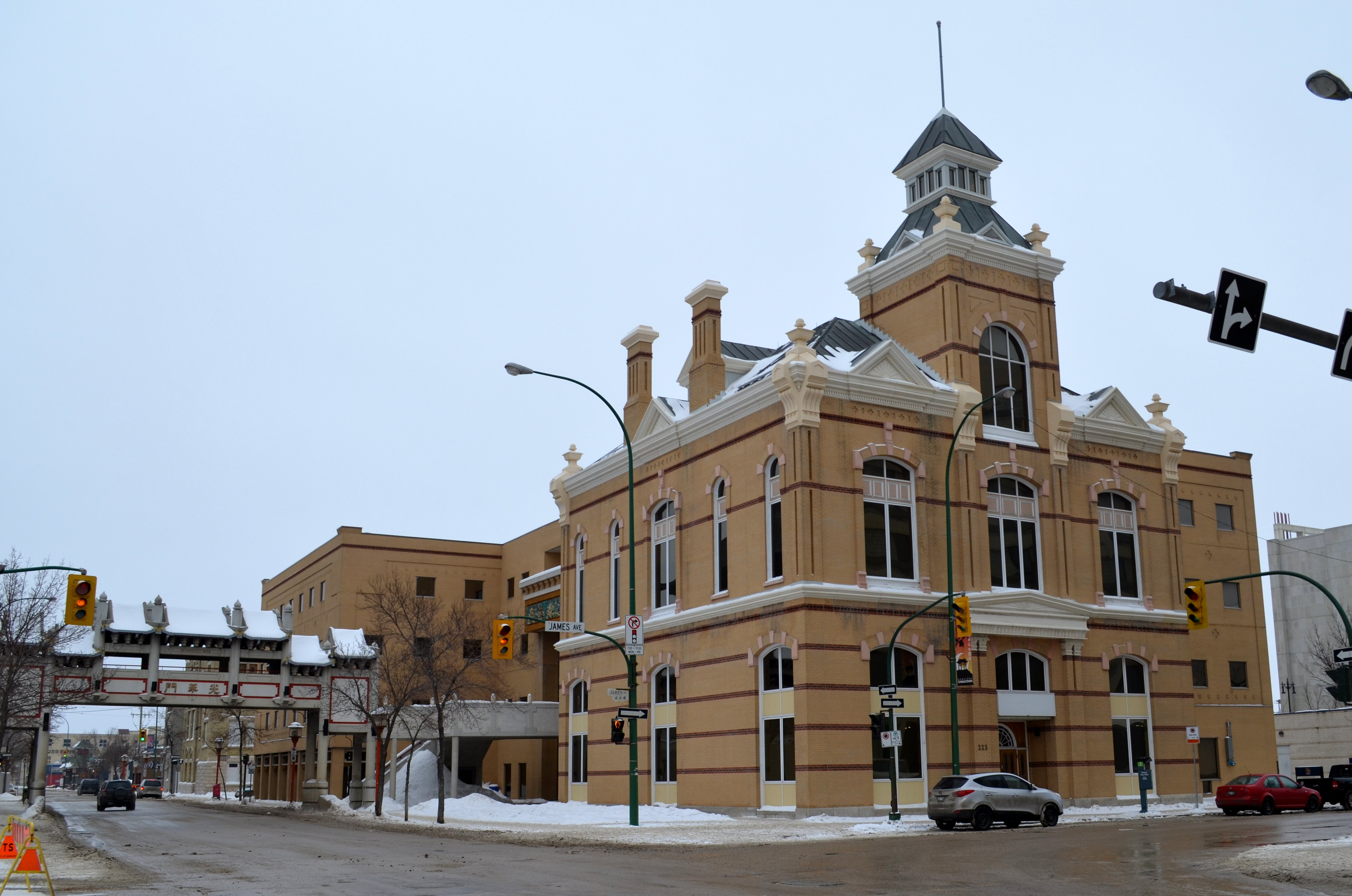
Former Winnipeg Hydro HQ/Mandarin Building

== Landscape and businesses ==
Winnipeg's Chinatown is a small neighbourhood in the city's downtown area, bounded by Logan Avenue to the north; Main Street to the east; James Avenue to the south; and Princess Street to the west.

The main constructs in today's Chinatown are the result of a rehabilitation and redevelopment scheme, and includes the interconnected Dynasty and Mandarin buildings, which were completed in 1987; along with Harmony Mansion and the Chinatown gate.

The 6-storey and 5,574 m^{2} (1.377 acres) Dynasty Building is located at 180 King Street and is the centrepiece of Chinatown. Its architecture shows influences from China's Hall and Gate of Supreme Harmony and Palace of Heavenly Purity. The multi-use building contains shops, banks, and offices, as well as the Chinese Culture and Community Centre. The Cultural Centre was opened on 1 August 1987, and houses a large multi-purpose room and library, the only Chinese library in Manitoba.

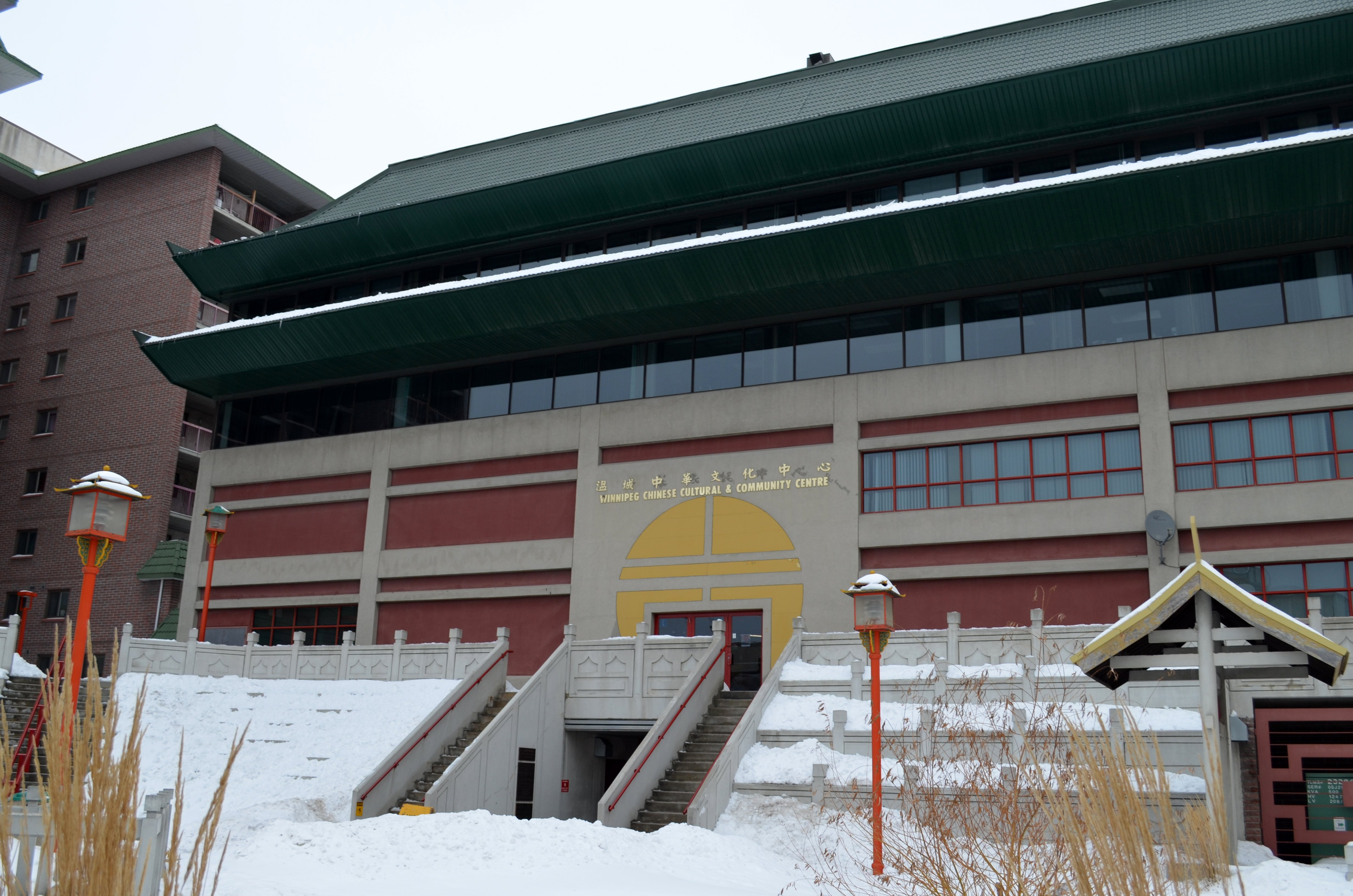
Winnipeg Chinese Cultural and Community Centre in the Dynasty Building

The 2-storey Mandarin Building sits at 223 James Avenue and was formerly the City of Winnipeg Police Court (later the City Engineering Building). The older portion of the building was constructed in 1883 and it initially held 18 jail cells, a large main-floor courtroom, office-space, and a police dormitory. The building is decorated with a replica of the Imperial Nine Dragons mural found in Beijing's Forbidden City.

Linked to the Dynasty Building is the CA$500,000 Chinatown Arch gate which sits at the entrance of the neighbourhood and connects the Dynasty and Mandarin buildings.

The Harmony Mansion, officially opened on 13 September 1986, is a 10-storey apartment complex on 201 Princess Street. It contains suites with a housing capacity of 500 tenants, as well as a 140-stall parkade.

The Peace Tower Housing, a 7-storey housing project, is the most recent addition to Winnipeg’s Chinatown. The project, built on the southwest corner of Logan and Princess streets, operates under the direction of the Peace Tower Housing Corporation. Using geothermal energy, the complex has 48 units (ranging from 1 bedroom to 3 bedrooms per unit), a 190 m^{2} (2,000 sq ft) multipurpose room, and an adjoining patio for recreational use. The project is financially supported by the municipal, provincial, and federal governments, and cost about $15 million. The first tenants moved into the building in spring 2013.

Shops and restaurants in Chinatown include: Young’s Market, Sun Wah Supermarket, Nan Bei Hang Herbal Products Co.; Sam Po Dim Sum Restaurant; Noodle Express; and Kum Koon Garden.

== Winnipeg Chinese Cultural and Community Centre ==
The Winnipeg Chinese Cultural and Community Centre (WCCCC) (Chinese: 温城中华文化中心) is a registered non-profit, charitable organization based in Winnipeg, Manitoba, Canada. Established in 1983 as a cornerstone of the multi-million dollar Winnipeg Chinatown redevelopment initiative, WCCCC operates as the cultural, social, and logistical anchor for the Chinese-Canadian community in Manitoba. The centre is physically situated inside the historic Dynasty Building in downtown Winnipeg’s Chinatown.

WCCC is deeply tied to the roots of urban revitalization and hosts many events during the year, including and not limited to Chinese Night Markets, leisure programs (Lion dancing, Dragon dancing and Chinese Calligraphy). It is also the Chinese Pavilion during the 2 weeks of Folklorama in August.

== Demographics ==
As of the 2006 Census, Chinatown has 605 residents living within 0.1 square kilometres (0.039 sq mi). 40.5% of the area's residents speak neither English nor French (as compared to 1% of Winnipeg as a whole), while 71.1% of residents speak some variant of Chinese (including Cantonese, Mandarin and Chinese not otherwise specified). 90% are in the Chinese visible minority group. 51.2% of residents reported that their place of birth was the People's Republic of China.

Only 53.9% of respondents over the age of 15 stated that they have a certificate, diploma or degree, as compared to 76.9% for the whole of Winnipeg. The most common mode of transport for residents is walking (38.6%), which is significantly higher than the percentage of Winnipeg residents who walk (6.2%). Average income for Chinatown residents is $15,481, while the average for Winnipeg is $33,457.

As of 2021, the Chinese population accounts for 44% of Chinatown, and residents born in China account for 34.1%. There is also a large Syrian community, as 11% of Chinatown was born in Syria
