= Central Park (Winnipeg) =

Coordinates: 49.896°N 97.1485°W

- Neighbourhood
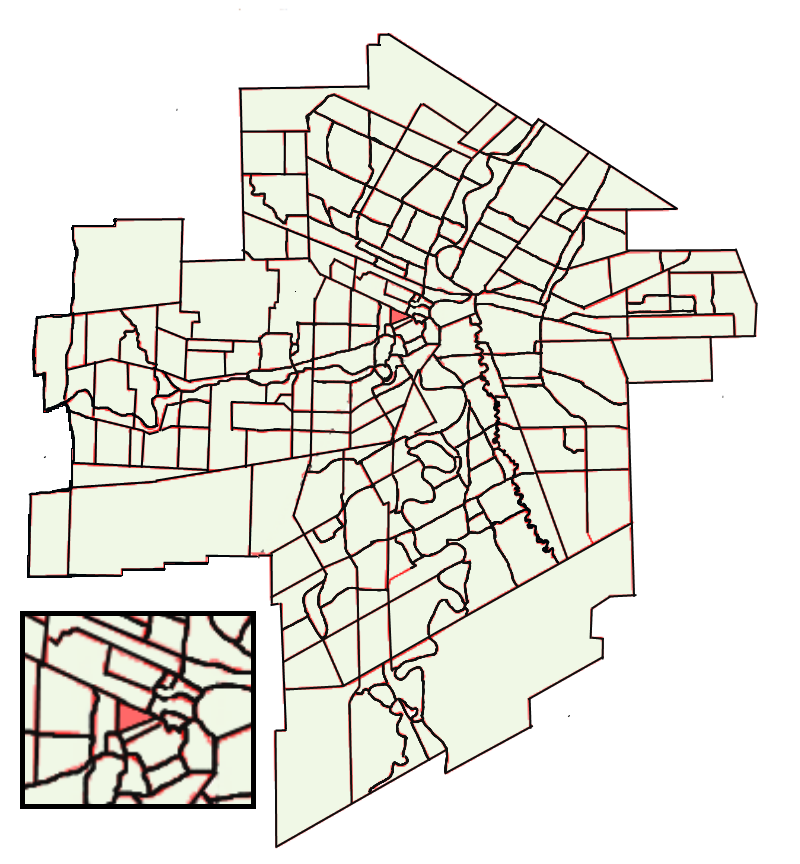
- Location of Central Park within Winnipeg
- Country: Canada
- Province: Manitoba
- City: Winnipeg

Area
  - Land: 0.2 km^{2} (0.077 sq mi)

Population (2021)
  - Total: 3,805
  - Density: 16,221.9/km^{2} (42,015/sq mi)
- Locations Type: Location
  - Neighbourhood Cluster: Downtown East
  - Community Area: Downtown
  - Police District: District 1
  - City Council Ward: Daniel McIntyre

Central Park is a large urban park located in downtown Winnipeg, and forms the heart of the neighbourhood of the same name.

The area is bound by Notre Dame Avenue to the north, Ellice Avenue to the south, Donald Street to the east and Balmoral Street to the west. Everything within the neighbourhood's one-kilometre loop can be reached within 8 minutes on foot. The neighbourhood is home to the largest concentration of Black Canadians in Manitoba, mostly African immigrants and refugees. 70 percent of all refugees coming to Winnipeg live downtown, largely settling in and around the Central Park area.

It is one of Winnipeg's most densely populated neighbourhoods with around 16,222 people per square km according to Statistics Canada's 2021 Census.

== Features ==
In addition to the Waddell Fountain, the park also features a four-season slide/toboggan facility, an interactive sand and water play area, an open area of artificial turf, and a wading pool and aquatic play pad.

=== Culture and entertainment ===
Central Park is a highly diverse neighbourhood. There is a large Filipino, African, and Indigenous population in the neighbourhood.

Because of the growing African population, the area has been transforming in recent years, giving it a new sense of community and culture. Its Central Market for Global Families is a summer outdoor market that sells handmade and imported African clothing, beadwork, handicrafts, weavings, art, as well as organic produce.

Live entertainment fills the air in Central Park on warm Friday nights throughout the summer and are a significant aspect to the markets on Saturday. Special events attract hundreds of people to the park on World Refugee Day in June, HIV/AIDS Awareness Day in July and Central Park Revival.

== Demographics ==
Population history
Year	Pop.	±%
2001	3,205	—
2006	3,555	+10.9%
2011	3,765	+5.9%
2016	3,775	+0.3%
2021	3,805	+0.8%
Source: "2021 Census Data - Central Park" - legacy.winnipeg.ca

In 2021, the population of Central Park was 3,805 people, with a population density of 16,221.9 people per square km. Central Park is a lower-income neighbourhood, with a median household income of $34,800, compared to the city's median household income of $80,000.As of 2021, 32.0% of Central Park's population were not Canadian citizens, which was above average for the City of Winnipeg as a whole, which was 13.9%. Central Park also boasted a higher percentage of recent immigrants (18.7%) than the city as a whole (6.0%). Most immigrant residents of Central Park are either born in the Philippines or an East African country.

Panethnic group	2021	
Panethnic group	Pop.	%
African	1,435	37.71%
Indigenous	675	17.74%
European (Note: Statistic includes all persons that did not make up part of a visible minority or an indigenous identity.)	610	16.03%
Filipino	565	14.85%
South Asian	165	4.34%
Southeast Asian (Note: Statistic includes total responses of "Filipino" and "Southeast Asian" under visible minority section on census.)	110	2.89%
Chinese (Note: Statistic includes total responses of "Chinese", "Korean", and "Japanese" under visible minority section on census.)	55	1.45%
Arab	45	1.18%
West Asian (Note: Statistic includes total responses of "West Asian" and "Arab" under visible minority section on census.)	30	0.79%
Latin American	20	0.53%
Other/multiracial (Note: Statistic includes total responses of "Visible minority, n.i.e." and "Multiple visible minorities" under visible minority section on census.)	60	1.58%
Total responses	3,770	99.08%
Total population	3,805	100%

== Crime ==
Central Park has a higher crime rate than the city as a whole. In 2012, there was one homicide making the rate per 100,000 residents 28.1. For other crimes, the rates per 100,000 follow as; 2025.3 for robbery, 84.4 for sexual assaults, 534.5 for break and enters and 281.3 for auto thefts.

== Architecture ==
Buildings around Central Park feature a diverse range of architectural styles and densities, coexisting with various shops and services. The YMCA building, Knox United Church, Calvary Temple, and a number of area schools provide a strong institutional component for families and senior citizens. Other landmark buildings are The International Centre, Welcome Place, and Edohei, considered to be Manitoba's first sushi restaurant.

== History ==
Central Park is one of Winnipeg’s earliest public parks. At the time of its establishment, such spaces were described as “ornamented squares and breathing areas.” The City of Winnipeg purchased the land from the Hudson’s Bay Company for $20,000 in 1893.

The site was originally swampy during summer months and contained large areas of unusable ground. Thousands of loads of manure and soil were added to raise and stabilize the land. Although this caused later settling, it also contributed to the development of lawns and gardens.

Park improvements were introduced gradually. A bandstand and two tennis courts were added in 1905, followed by an iron fence and a drinking fountain in 1909. The Waddell Fountain was installed in 1914. Playground equipment was added in 1936, and public restrooms were constructed in 1959.

In 1985, the city closed a section of Qu’Appelle Street, extending the park north to Ellice Avenue. An earlier master plan had proposed a landscaped connection between Central Park and the Manitoba Legislative grounds, but this was abandoned during the development of North Portage and Portage Place mall between 1985 and 1987. The expansion increased the park’s size to 1.9 hectares (4.8 acres).

Between 2008 and 2012, the park underwent a major renovation based on designs by the architecture firm Scatliff+Miller+Murray. The project received a 2015 Premier’s Award for Design Excellence, Award of Merit in Landscape Architecture.

=== Waddell Fountain ===
The Waddell Fountain in Central Park is a rare example of the High Victorian Gothic style in Manitoba, and is based on the Scott Monument, an 1844 Gothic Revival monument in Edinburgh for Romantic poet Sir Walter Scott.

The fountain commemorates Emily Margaret Waddell, who died in 1908. Her will was written in 1904 but only discovered in 1911. In it, Emily Waddell stipulated, "in case of his marrying again, ten thousand dollars is to be expended for public fountain in Central park, Winnipeg." Thomas Waddell, who did remarry, raised the money in 1914 and chose the design by local architect John Manuel. Manuel also designed structures at the University of Manitoba, and would later move to Alberta in 1927 to oversee construction of Canadian Pacific Railway hotels in Banff and Lake Louise.

The fountain was completed by William Penn Stone Company of Minneapolis in 1914 for a cost of $9,722.19, and consisted of white stone on a granite base with a concrete basement to house the water pump.

In 1988, the fountain was declared a historical site. By 1992, it was falling badly into disrepair.

The fountain was dismantled and fixed offsite in 2010 to facilitate needed repairs. The 2010 restoration project won the Heritage Winnipeg Preservation Award.
