= Manitoba Electronic Music Exhibition =

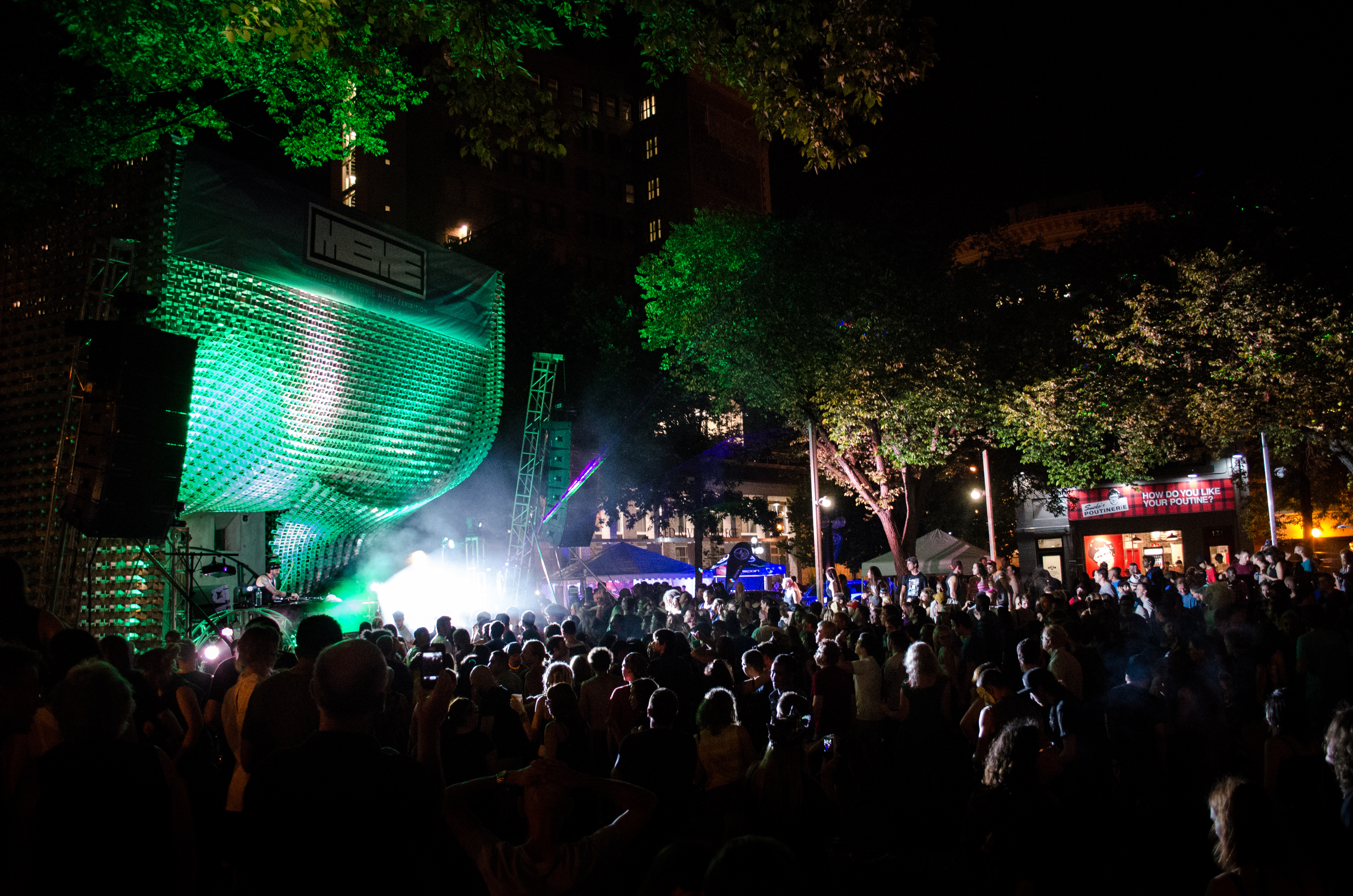
- Manitoba Electronic Music Exhibition 2013
- Genre: Electronic dance music,
- Locations: Winnipeg, Manitoba, Canada
- Years active: 2010–19, 2021-present
- Website: www.memetic.cawww.memefest.ca

Manitoba Electronic Music Exhibition aka "MEME" is a yearly electronic music and digital arts festival started in 2010 in Winnipeg, Manitoba, Canada.

MEME is Western Canada's leading electronic music and digital arts festival. MEME features various concerts, events, workshops and a series of free outdoor concerts located at The Cube in Winnipeg's Old Market Square in the Exchange District as well as all over Winnipeg in a variety of venues that have included The Forks Market, Pantages Playhouse, The Winnipeg Art Gallery, The Met Theatre and smaller club venues. The 4 day festival is only one component to MEMETIC's participation in the arts and culture scene in Winnipeg, with events held year round that showcase local talent, and bring in world class acts. Some special events include participating in Nuit Blanche as a partner with the Winnipeg Art Gallery, participating in arts education by partnering with the West Broadway Youth Association as well as entering a float representing the MEME festival in the Winnipeg Pride Parade (Award won in 2015 for Best Musical Entry). Club nights include general music/vj focused events, as well as specialty nights such as an electro swing night (Roaring 2020s) and a middle eastern/world themed night (1001 Nights). Halloween and New Year's Eve are also major event nights for MEME shows.

Headliners of the exhibition have included Deepchild, a Berlin-based Australian DJ and Funk d’Void. Notable past performers at MEME include: Thomas Fehlmann, Kevin Saunderson, Mike Monday, Pezzner, Dandy Jack and Bluetech.

The event was cancelled in 2020.

== See also ==
- List of electronic music festivals
