= Exchange District =

Neighbourhood in Winnipeg, Canada

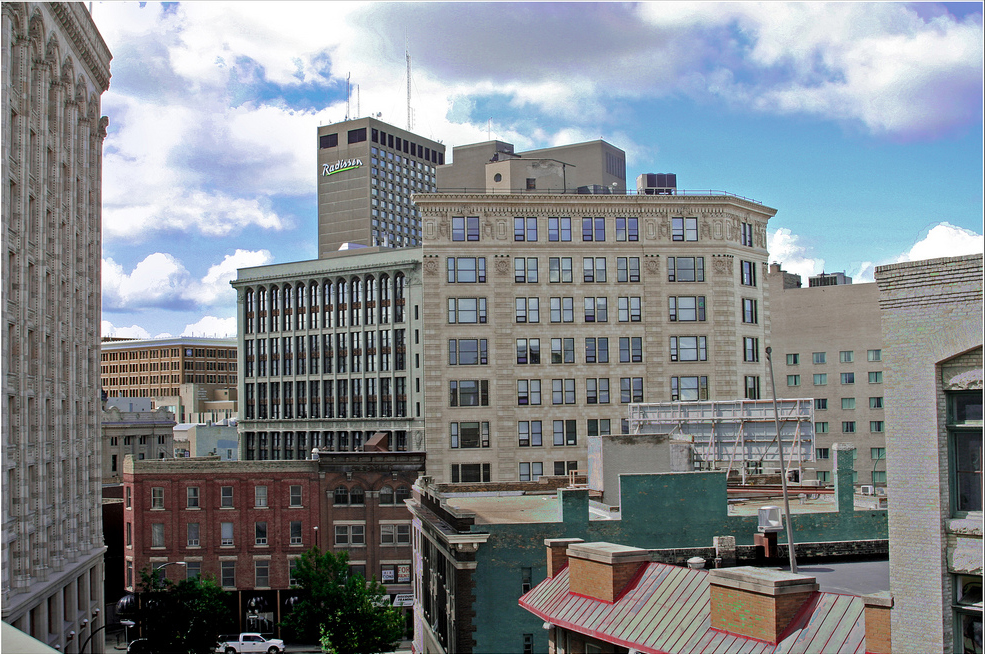
- Buildings in Winnipeg's Exchange District

- Location within Manitoba
- 49°53′54.6″N 97°8′25.08″W
- Type: Neighbourhood
- Location: Winnipeg, Manitoba, Canada

History
- Founded: 1881
- Original use: Warehouse district

Site notes
- Current use: Mixed use
- Governing body: Exchange District BIZ, Heritage Winnipeg
- Website: www.exchangedistrict.org

National Historic Site of Canada

The Exchange District is a National Historic Site of Canada in the downtown area of Winnipeg, Manitoba, Canada. Just one block north of Portage and Main, the Exchange District comprises twenty city blocks and approximately 150 heritage buildings, and it is known for its intact early 20th century collection of warehouses, financial institutions, and early terracotta-clad skyscrapers.

The Exchange is home to the Manitoba Museum as well as the Planetarium and a Science Gallery. The Exchange District spans two distinct areas, the East Exchange and the West Exchange. The east Exchange area is located between the Disraeli Freeway, Waterfront Drive, William Stephenson Way, and Main Street, and the West Exchange is bounded by Adelaide Street, Ross Avenue, Notre Dame Avenue, and Main Street.

== History ==
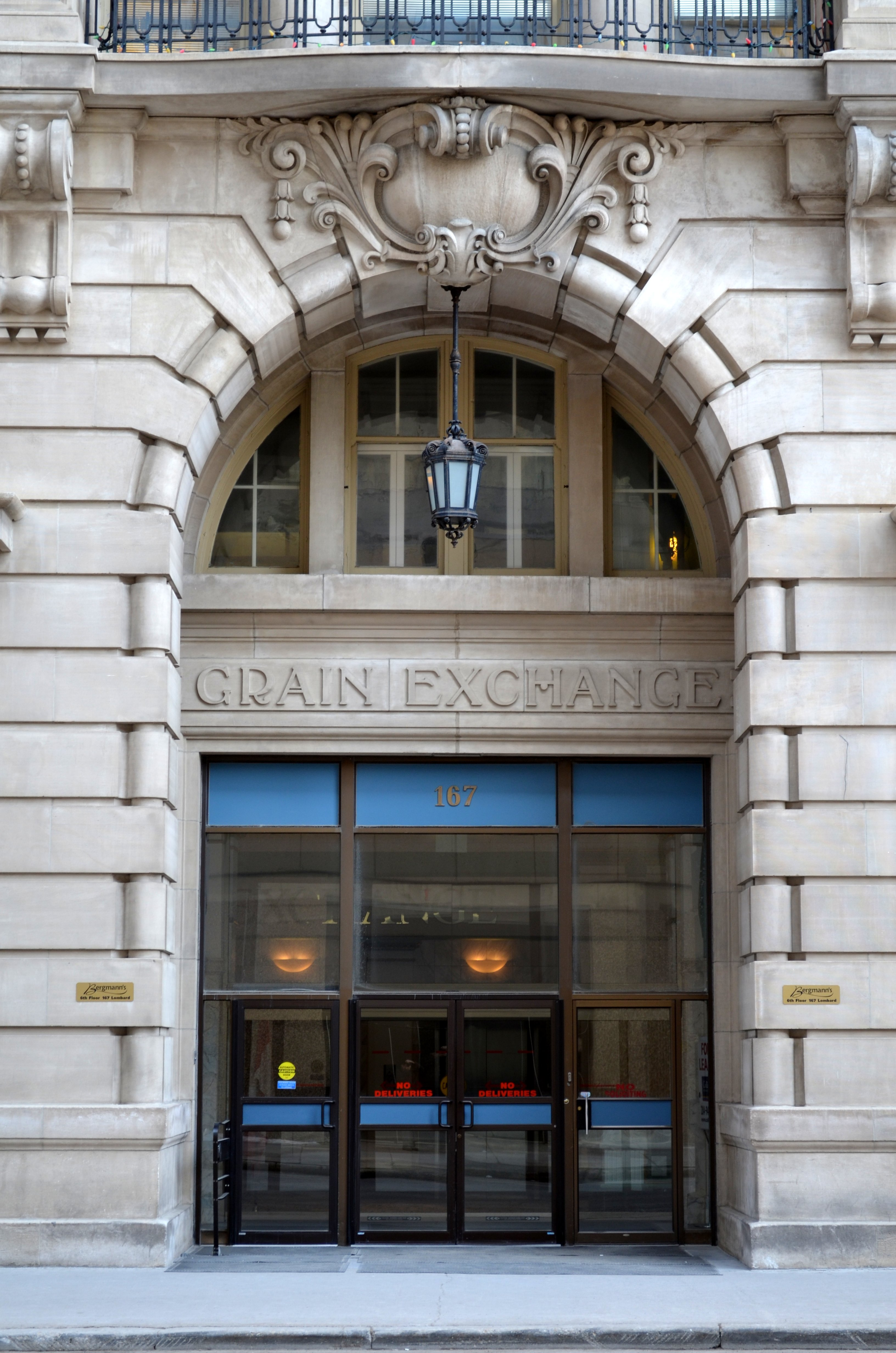
Entrance to the Grain Exchange building at 167 Lombard Ave

The Exchange District’s name originates from the Winnipeg Grain Exchange, the former centre of the grain industry in Canada, as well as other commodity exchanges that developed in Winnipeg between 1881–1918, some of which are still active today. (see Winnipeg Commodity Exchange.)

Winnipeg was one of the fastest-growing cities in North America around the turn of the 20th century. The city became known as the Chicago of the North. Much of Winnipeg’s remaining architecture of the late 1800s and early 1900s is heavily influenced by the Chicago style. By 1911, Winnipeg had become the third largest city in Canada. At the time it had more than two dozen rail lines converging near the city centre, along with over 200 wholesale businesses.

World War I and the opening of the Panama Canal in 1914 slowed Winnipeg's growth, as there was a new route for shipping goods from Eastern Canada and Europe to Western Canada and from East Asia to the larger markets on the Eastern seaboard. As wholesale operations began to open in other Western Canadian cities, such as Edmonton, Moose Jaw, and Regina, Winnipeg's importance as a wholesale centre declined in the 1910s and 1920s. By the 1940s, many of the warehouses in the Exchange District had been converted into uses related to the garment trade.

As Winnipeg began to experience growth in the years following World War II, much of Winnipeg’s downtown development shifted to the area of downtown south of Portage Avenue, particularly along Broadway and on towards Osborne Village. The lack of new development, mixed with the existing demand for inexpensive wholesaling and manufacturing space, left the Exchange District largely intact. As a result, Winnipeg today has one of the most historically intact early 20th century commercial districts in North America.

In the early 1980s the streetscaping in the area was improved with the creation of wider sidewalks, historically appropriate street furniture, lighting, and decorative paving patterns and materials.

On September 27, 1997, the Winnipeg Exchange District was declared a National Historic Site by then-federal Minister of Canadian Heritage, Sheila Copps.

== Attractions ==
The Exchange District is one of Winnipeg's commercial and cultural centers, with an array of specialty retailers, restaurants, nightclubs, art galleries, wholesalers, and condos.

=== Theatres ===
Winnipeg's theatre district is located on the east side of the Exchange District, home to the Royal Manitoba Theatre Centre, and Centennial Concert Hall which houses the Winnipeg Symphony Orchestra, the Royal Winnipeg Ballet, and the Manitoba Opera.

The west side of the Exchange is home to Cinematheque, a small movie theatre located on the main floor of the Artspace building on Albert Street.

=== Education ===
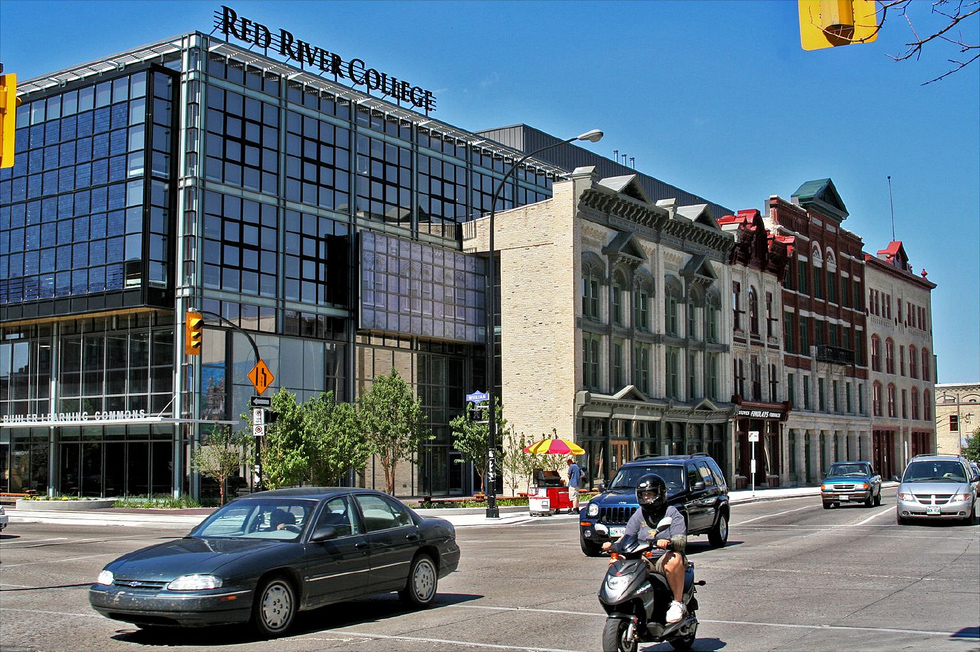
Red River College's Roblin Centre

Red River College's Roblin Centre is a 220,000-square-foot (20,000 m^{2}) building that features the original façades along Princess Street, and incorporates modern green building technology. The Roblin Centre's construction merged five prominent heritage buildings on Princess Street as well as a 1905 warehouse on William Avenue. It is home to approximately 200 staff and 2,000 students. The Centre has a focus on modern media, information technology, and business.

The Paterson GlobalFoods Institute is a new addition to RRC's Exchange District Campus as of 2013. The Institute is located at the Union Bank Building, an 11-storey structure that dates back to 1903, and is the home of the Culinary Arts, Hospitality and Tourism Management and Professional Baking and Patisserie programs.

=== Old Market Square ===
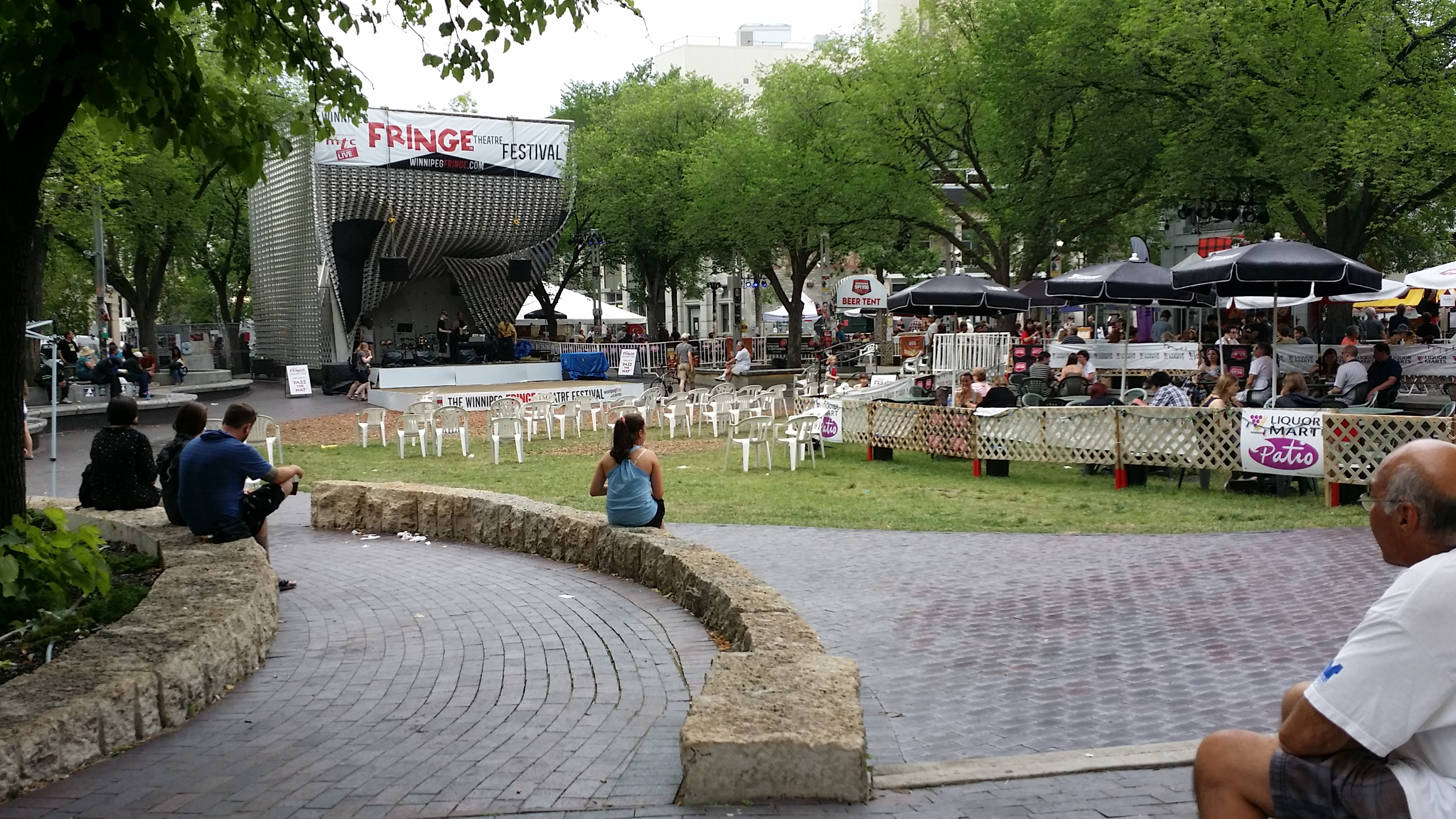
Winnipeg Fringe Festival at the Cube in Old Market Square

Old Market Square hosts the annual Winnipeg International Jazz Festival, the Winnipeg Fringe Theatre Festival, and the Manitoba Electronic Music Exhibition. Its cobblestone streets and friendly pedestrian environment also contribute to The Exchange District's popularity as a period backdrop for the movie industry. Most notably the 2006 film The Assassination of Jesse James by the Coward Robert Ford starring Brad Pitt, and the 2006 film The Lookout starring Jeff Daniels.

Old Market Square originated in 1889, initially as a public market building. Originally located on the site of what is now the Public Safety Building, it was the centre of Winnipeg's early commercial trade. In 1964 to 1965, the original building as well as several nearby structures were razed to make room for the current Civic Centre. In 1970, an "Old Market Square Association" was created to lobby for the preservation and improvement of the site.

In 1976, the national historic trust, Heritage Canada, announced a $500,000 grant to towards the purchase and restoration of significant buildings in the Old Market Square area, with a focus on Albert Street and what was then known as "Albert Street Park". The park became the venue for a farmer's market which brought momentum to the rejuvenation of the area. In 1990, a permanent stage was built in the park.

Begun in 2008 and completed in 2012, a revitalization program began that improved landscaping, drainage, sod and lighting. Developed by Scatliff+Miller+Murray, the new area features a performance space, a sunken event lawn, serpentine seating wall and seating planters encircling elm trees. The focal point of the renovation was "The Cube", a new $1.5 million stage, with a skin made up of 20,000 aluminum links. Designed by 5468796 Architecture, the stage contains a built-in lighting system, green room and two performance levels, and was funded by The Winnipeg Foundation, CentreVenture, and several levels of government. The 28-foot (8.5 m) by 28-foot (8.5 m) cube is composed of a flexible curtain of diamond extrusions strung together. The curtain can be drawn back to reveal the stage within.

The cube has not functioned properly since it was opened in 2010. In summer 2012, the Cube was closed due to concerns about supports for the metal curtain. Repairs for the structure are planned for the spring of 2013 and are expected to include fixes for faulty lights and cooling fans, additional railings and handrails, alterations to the rear of the stage and accessibility improvements.

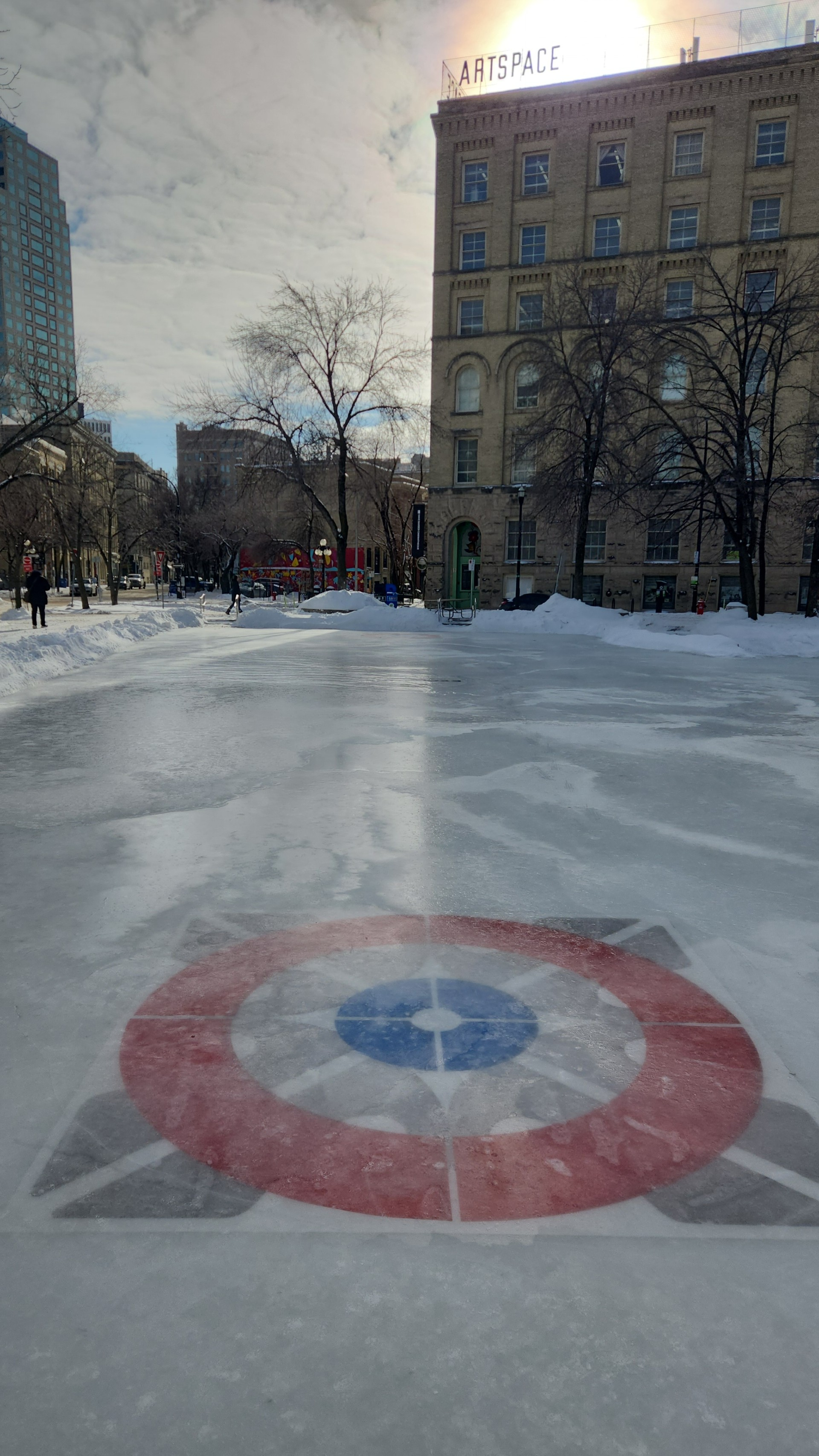
Outdoor Curling Rink set up at Old Market Square in the Exchange District

Plans are underway to redevelop the 2.4 acres (0.97 ha) site of the former Public Safety Building and Parkade (c. 1966). CentreVenture is in charge of choosing the design of Marketlands, featuring a farmers market and residential component. In 2025, the city of Winnipeg installed Turf and a new drainage system for the square, eliminating the grass and maintenance that comes with it.

=== Centennial Centre ===
The Centennial Centre area is an arts and cultural district that covers a 34-acre area in the East Exchange District, linking several of Manitoba's important arts and cultural facilities, including the Centennial Concert Hall, Manitoba Theatre Centre, and the Manitoba Museum and Planetarium.

== Transportation ==
Roads

There are no high speed roads that pass through or near the Exchange District. Regular urban speed limits are observed on Portage Avenue, Main Street on the boundaries of the area.

Cycling

There is a painted cycling lane along McDermot Avenue between Main Street and the Health Sciences Centre campus.

Transit

Several transit routes travel through the Exchange District: FX2, FX3, F8, D16, 43, 31.

Boat

At one time the Alexander Docks functioned as an urban dock in downtown Winnipeg which tourist riverboat the Paddlewheel Queen and others had used for decades. This has since been shut down and is in the process of being updated.

== Proposals ==
=== Albert St. Pedestrian Mall ===
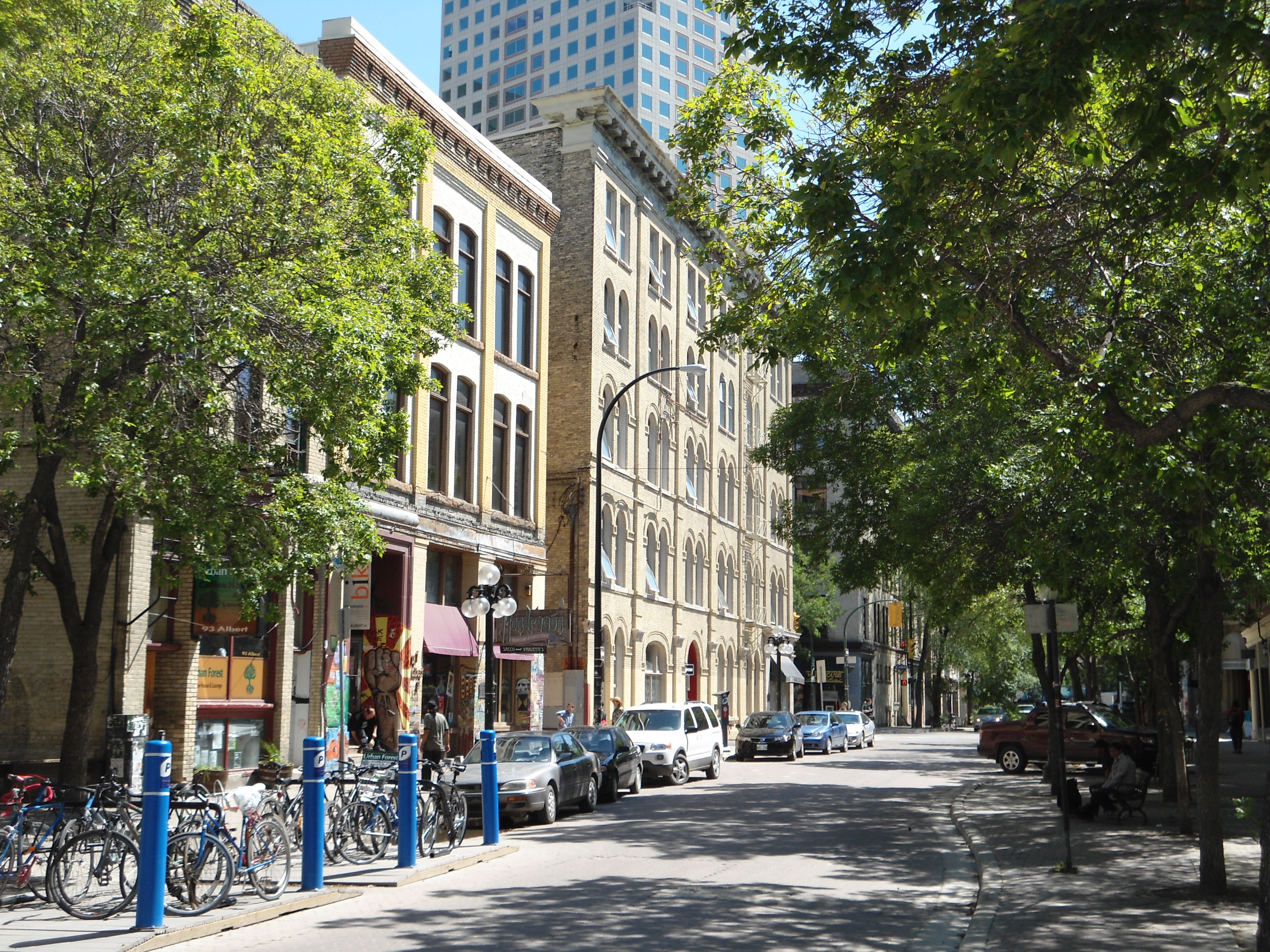
Albert Street, in the Exchange District

A pedestrian mall was proposed for the area in August 2010 by local architect Brent Bellamy. The proposed pedestrian mall would be located along two blocks of Albert Street to the Old Market Square and closed to automobile traffic. The hope of the mall would be to accentuate the uniqueness of the neighbourhood, attract workers from Portage and Main, and be sustained over the long-term with residential development in the area.

=== Alexander Docks ===
The city had issued an RFP in 2007 to redevelop the Alexander Docks site, which had been built by the federal government in 1929. Liberal Senator Rod Zimmer won the bidding process through his proposed $10-million development plan which would include a boutique hotel (restaurant, meeting space) and marina.

A consortium comprising CentreVenture, the Manitoba Association of Architects, The Forks, the Exchange District BIZ, as well as several architectural firms held an international design competition, On the Docks, in 2018 for the redevelopment of Alexander Docks. Over 200 designs were entered. The winner of the design competition was Cornoiu Sabin of Romania for his "Alexander's Garden".

== Demographics ==
According to the 2016 census, the Exchange District has approximately 0.10% of Winnipeg's population with 630 people (+41.6%), up from 445 at the time of the 2011 census. The Exchange District makes up 0.1% of the city's total land area.

The district's population age is wide between early twenties and up; there is no dominant age group of residents. The district has a lower proportion of visible minorities, with only 13.5%, as compared to 28% for the whole of Winnipeg. Over 30.6% of respondents in the district reported as "Never married (single)", as compared to 31.4% of Winnipeg. The district lends itself to pedestrian travel: over 44.3% of employed respondents stated walking as their primary mode of transportation, significantly higher than the 4.9% reported for the entire city. The average employment income in the Exchange District is $79,831, as compared to $61,164 for Winnipeg as a whole.

== See also ==
- Winnipeg arts and culture
