= Winnipeg Walkway =

Network of pedestrian skyways and tunnels

Coordinates: 49°53′44″N 97°08′19″W

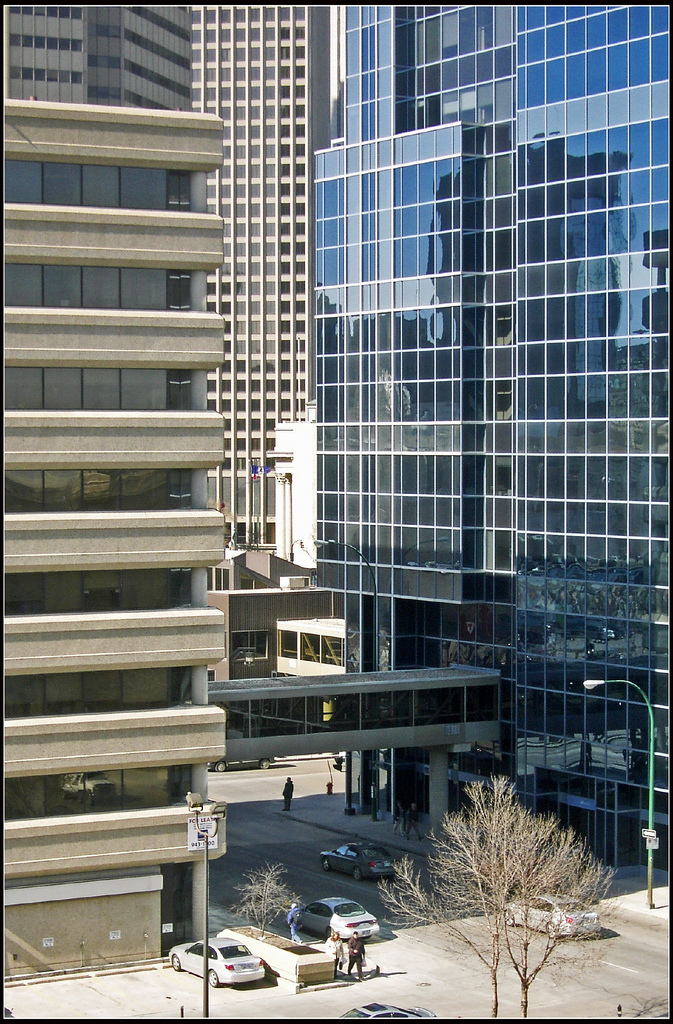
Part of the Winnipeg Skywalk system, connecting the Cargill Building to 200 Graham Avenue

The Winnipeg Walkway System, also known as the Winnipeg Skywalk, is a network of pedestrian skyways and tunnels connecting a significant portion of downtown Winnipeg, Manitoba.

The City of Winnipeg described the Walkway as a system of 14 skyways and 7 tunnels connecting 38 buildings and allowing for a maximum protected walk of 2 km. The system also provides year-round climate-controlled access to over 170,000 m^{2} (42 acres) of space, including over 200 shops and businesses, 10 office complexes, 60 restaurants and snack bars, 700 apartment units, 2 hotels, 11 financial centres, and the Winnipeg Millennium Library, bringing together 21,000 employees. The walkway system has expanded since its initial construction.

The Walkway is subdivided into four interconnected segments: its skyways chiefly cover Portage, Graham, and St. Mary Avenues; and its underground section includes Winnipeg Square and the underground Portage and Main concourse.

It is open every day of the week, typically from 07:00 AM to 6:00 PM, though some individual building hours vary.

== Network segments ==
Beginning in 2004, in anticipation of the openings of the MTS Centre and Millennium Library, a new unified system of signage was developed for the entire network to assist wayfinding therein. This process brought with it the branding of the system as the Winnipeg Walkway and the subdivision of the network into four interconnected segments.

=== Main Underground ===
Concrete relief by Bruce Head, taken from under Portage, facing north.

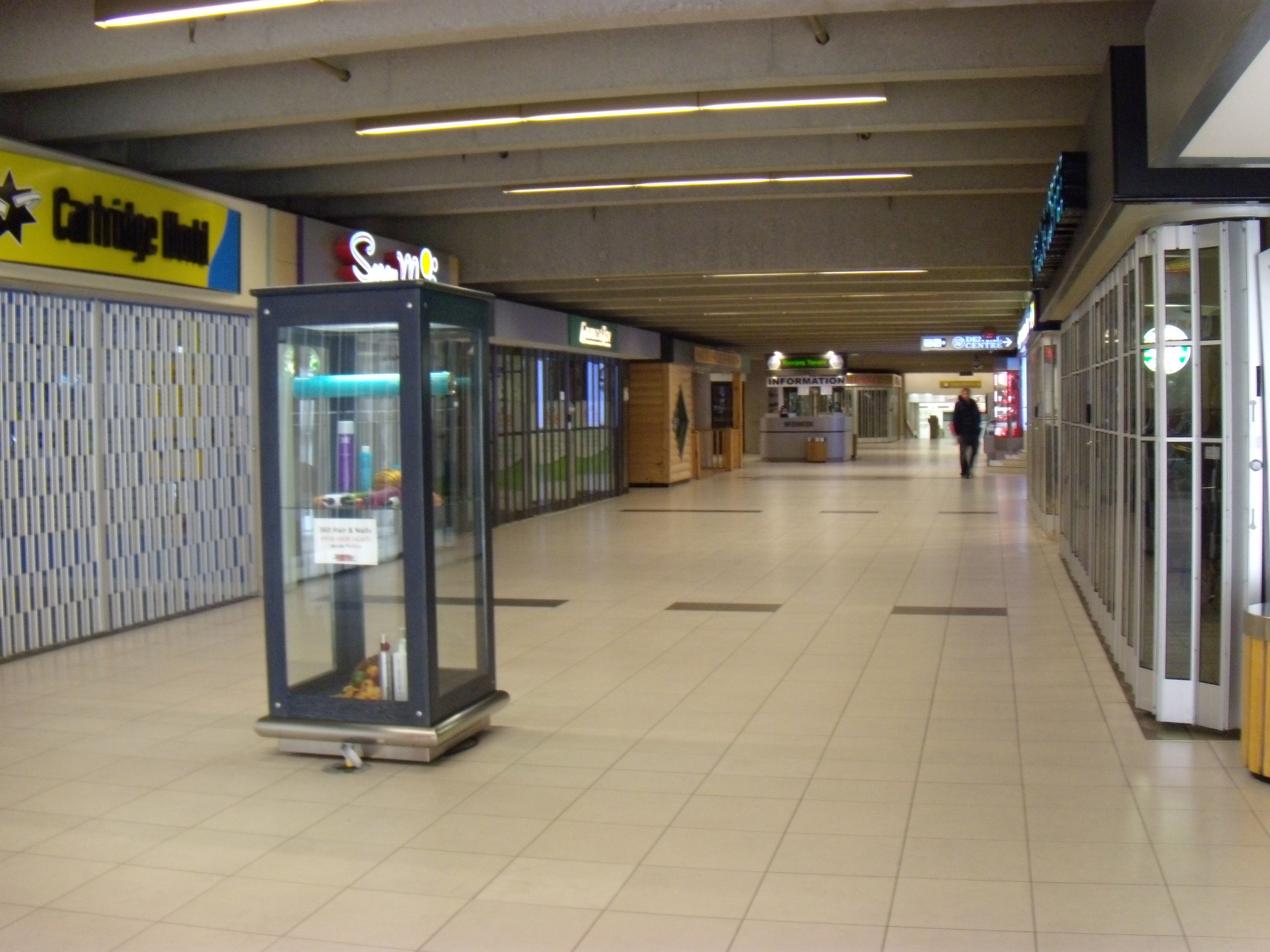
Shops in Winnipeg Square underground mall

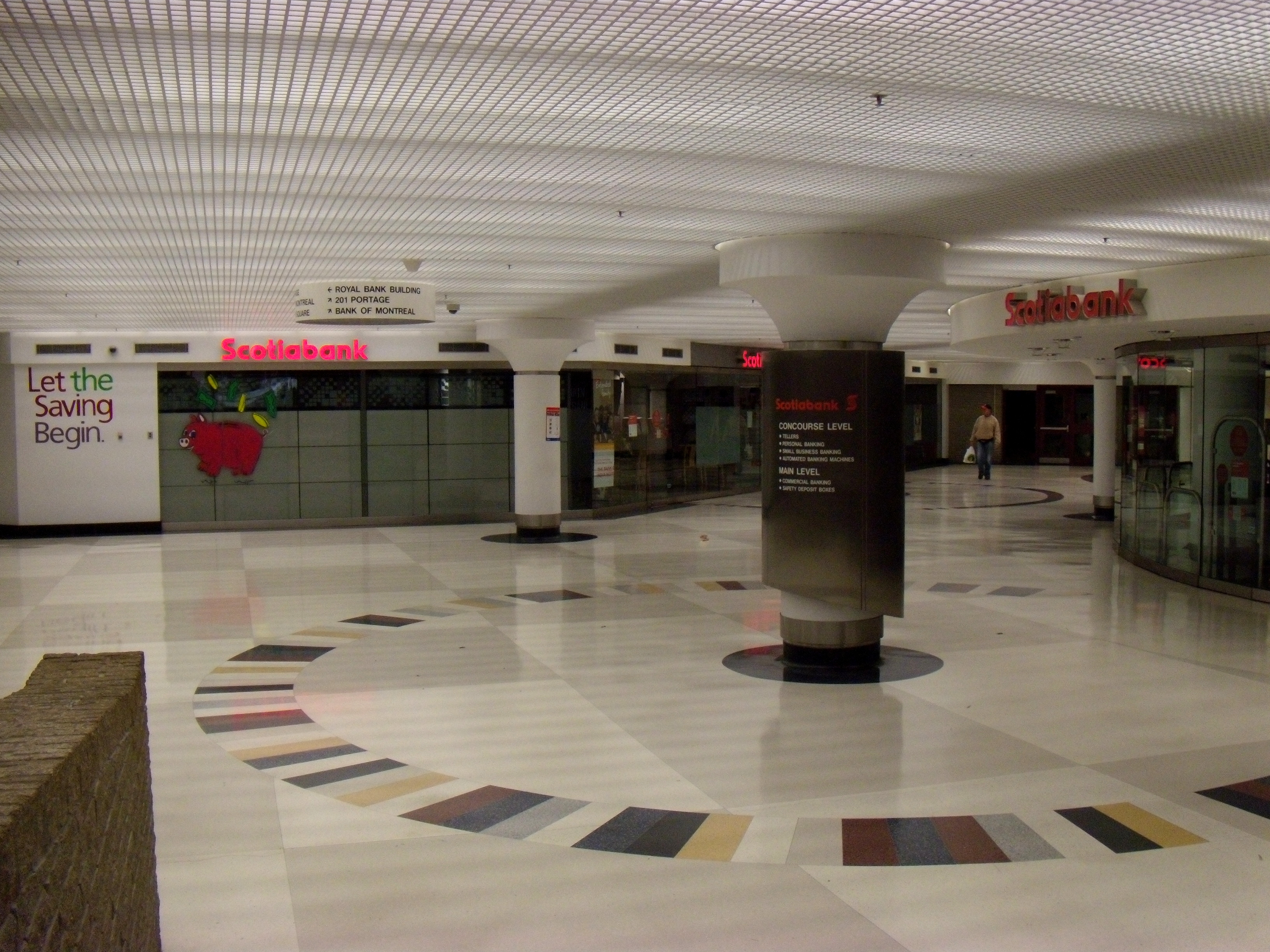
Scotiabank Concourse

The Main Underground portion of the network is centred underneath the historic intersection of Portage and Main. Until 2025, this intersection was closed to pedestrians; it was not (legally) possible to cross it without going underground.

On a much smaller scale, this segment is somewhat reminiscent of Montreal's Underground City. Via a network of tunnels, the Main Underground connects the following:

- Portage and Main Pedestrian Loop
- Trizec Complex
  - Winnipeg Square
  - 360 Main (formerly Commodity Exchange Tower)
    - TD Canada Trust
  - 300 Main
  - 200 Portage
- Royal Bank Building (220 Portage)
- 201 Portage (formerly Canwest Place, CanWest Global Place, and TD Centre)
  - TDS Law
  - Concourse Sports/Ergonomic Physiotherapy
- 35 Albert Street (201 Portage Parkade)
- Electric Railway Chambers (Connected via skywalk to second floor of parkade)
- Lombard Place
  - Richardson Building
    - CIBC
  - Fairmont Winnipeg Hotel
  - Lombard Concourse
  - 161 Portage Avenue East
  - Grain Exchange Building
- Former Bank of Montreal Building
- 333 Main
- 191 Pioneer (Via 333 Main)

At the southwestern corner of Winnipeg Square, near the intersection of Graham Avenue and Fort Street, there are escalator, lift and stairway connections to the second floor of 200 Graham Avenue, thereby connecting the Main Underground to the Graham Skywalk.

There are several structural pads atop Winnipeg Square, with 360 Main and 300 Main built upon them. Construction of the 42-story residential tower at 300 Main Street began in Fall 2018, and was completed in 2021, making it Winnipeg's tallest building.

=== Graham Skywalk ===
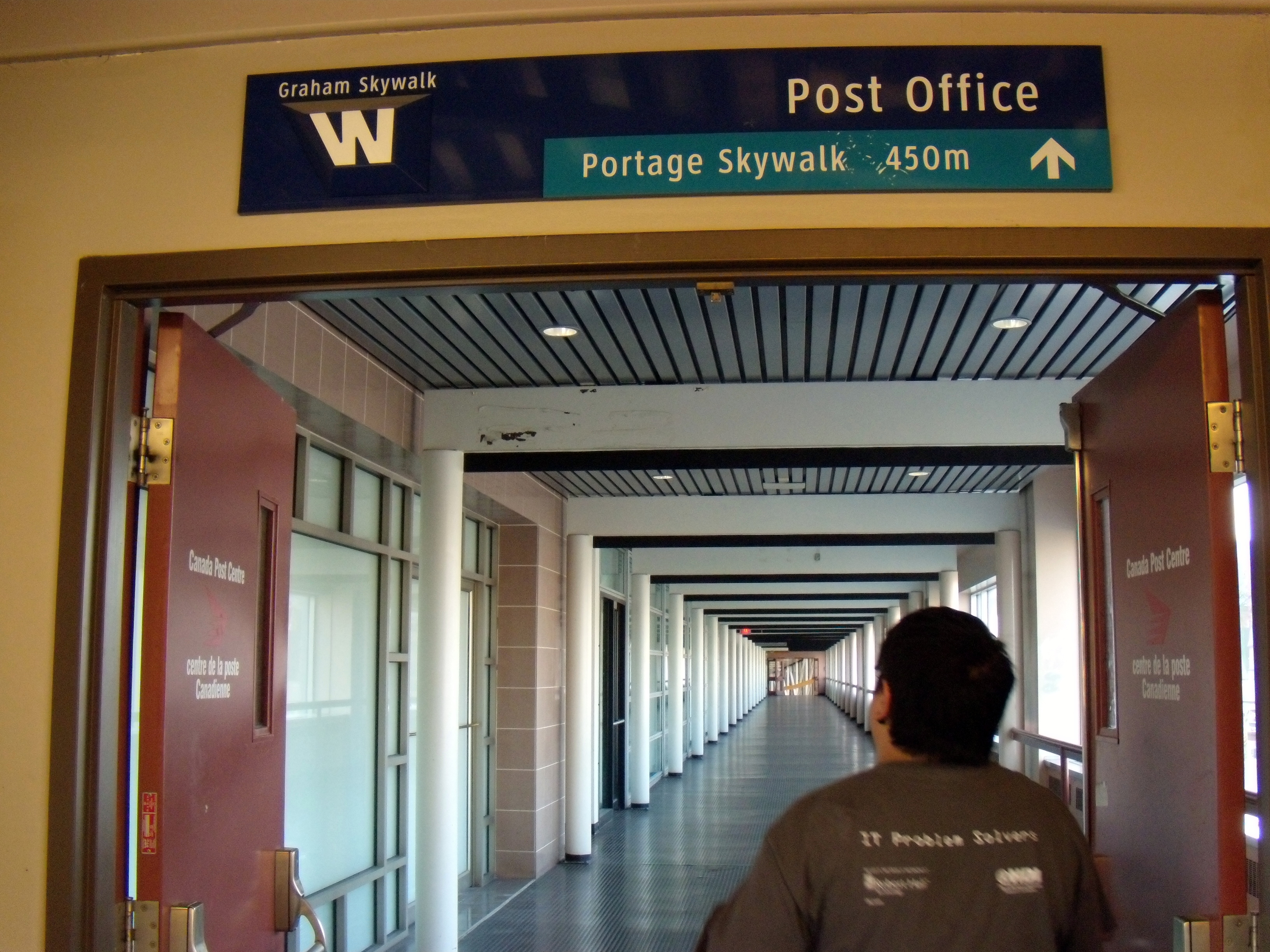
Post Office connection of the Winnipeg Walkway system

The Graham Skywalk consists of a series of skyways connecting the buildings on the south side of Graham Avenue, between Main and Hargrave Street, as well as the Canada Life Centre (the former site of the historic Eaton's store) and the former Eaton's power station on the north side.

From east to west, this portion of the network provides access to the following:

- 200 Graham Avenue
  - BDO Canada Ltd.
- Cargill Building (240 Graham Ave)
  - HSBC
- 266 Graham Ave
- Millennium Library
- CityPlace
- Canada Life Centre
- Powerhouse Building (345 Graham Ave)
  - CTV Winnipeg
  - Winnipeg Jets Main Office
- Cityplace Parkade (266 Hargrave St)
- True North Square
  - 242 Hargrave St
    - Scotiabank
    - Hargrave St. Market
  - 223 & 225 Carlton St
  - 236 Carlton St
    - Wawanesa Insurance

The Canada Life Centre can be said to be a major hub in the Winnipeg Walkway network as it connects the Graham Skywalk to the Portage Skywalk.

=== Portage Skywalk ===
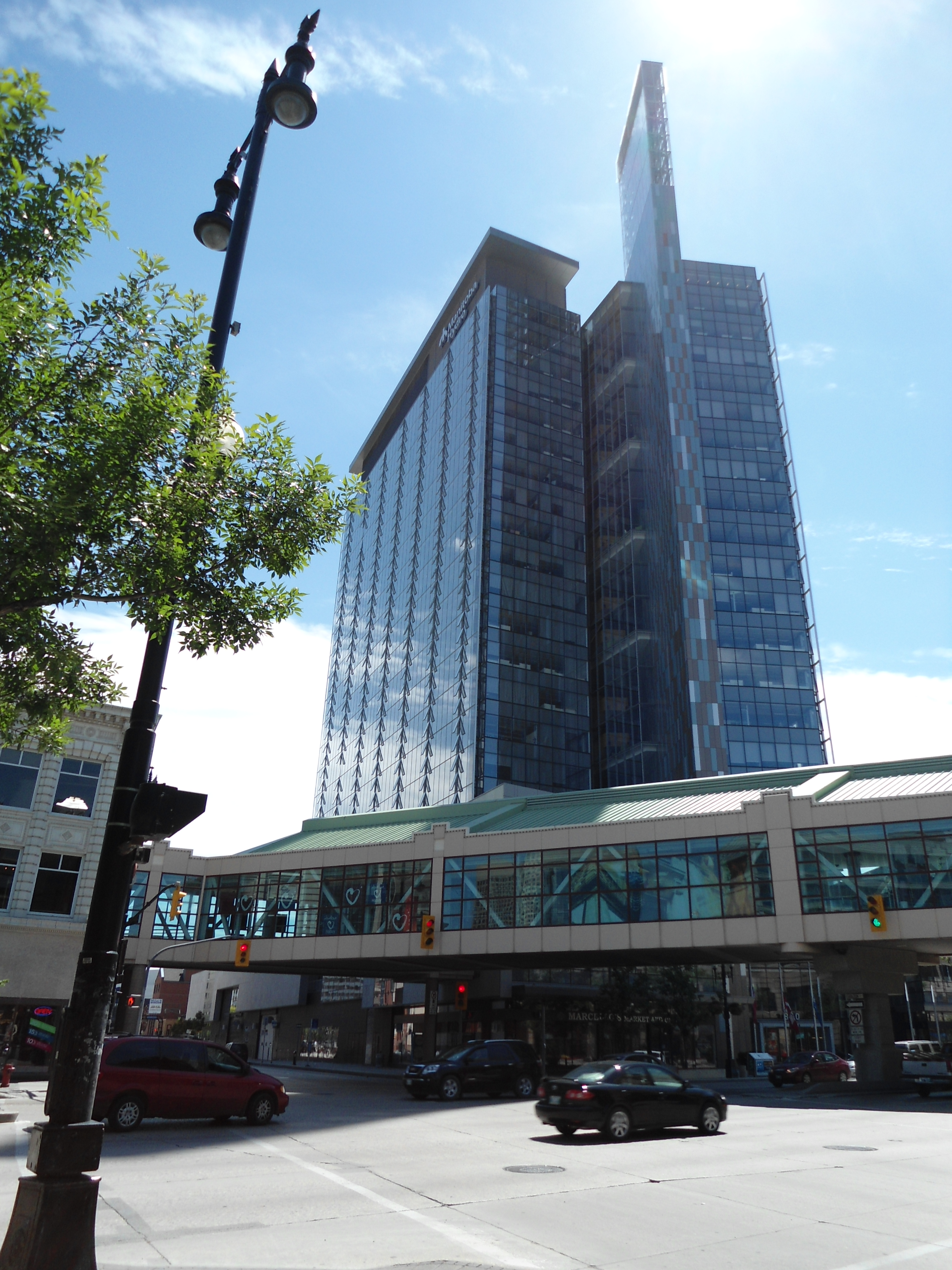
A section of the skywalk over Portage Avenue, with the LEED-platinum-certified Manitoba Hydro Place in the background.

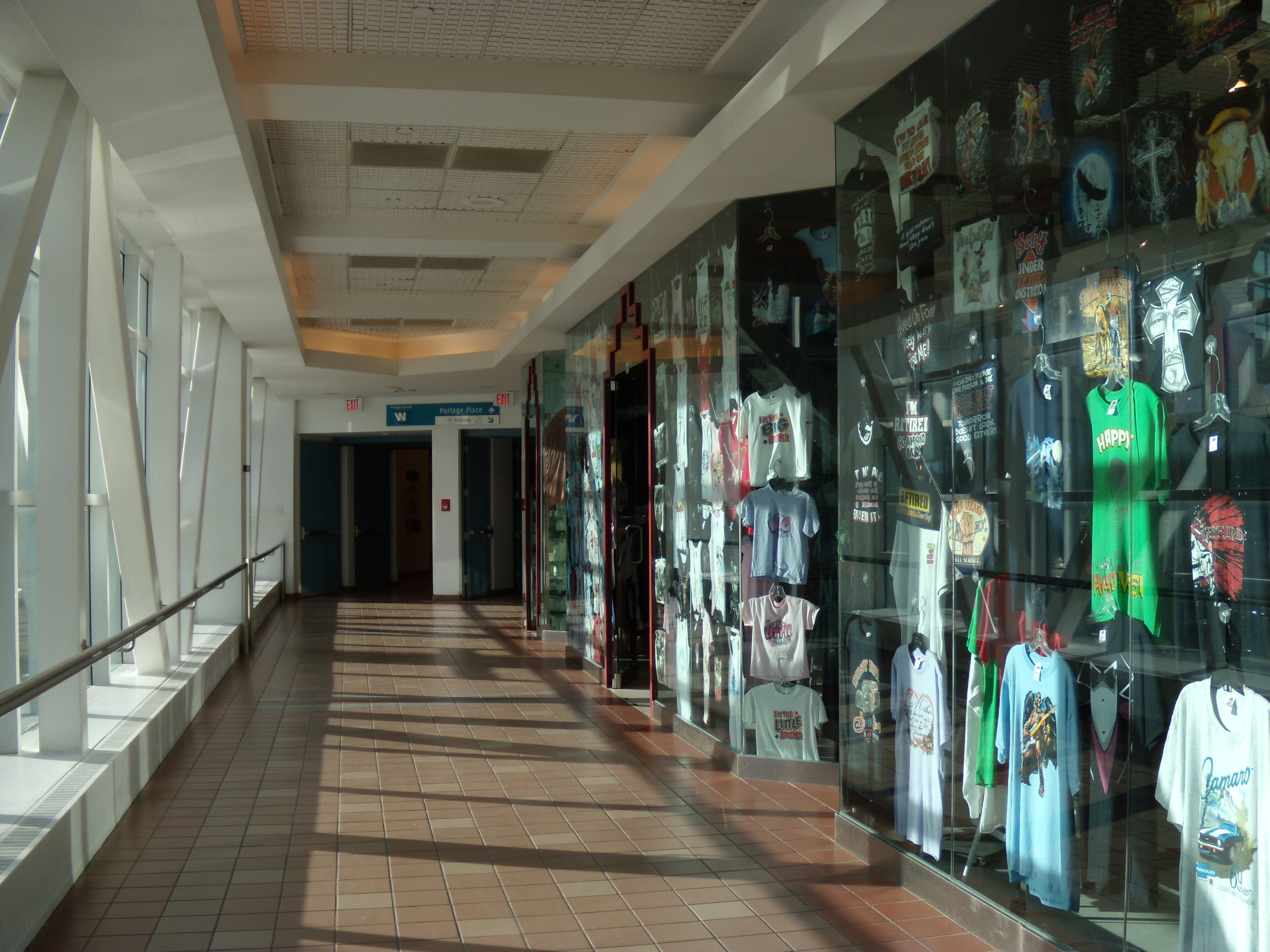
Shops in Winnipeg Walkway connecting Portage Place to the Hydro building

The Portage Skywalk segment of the Winnipeg Walkway boasts many of the shopping and entertainment attractions most often associated with downtown Winnipeg. An extensive network of skyways and second-floor pedestrian rights-of-way connects various buildings on the south side of Portage Avenue, with the three-block Portage Place shopping and entertainment complex between Carlton and Vaughan Street on the north side. Several neighbouring residential, recreational and commercial buildings, including the One Canada Centre tower between Vaughan and Colony Street, are directly connected to Portage Place. At the western edge of Portage Place there is a skyway link to The Bay department store and the Power Building on the south side of Portage Avenue. Via an open-air connection through the covered parkade of The Bay, the network reaches further south, providing access to the Saint Mary Skywalk.

More specifically, from east to west, the Portage Skywalk links the following:

- Radisson Hotel (Via parkade)
- Somerset Place
- Canada Life Centre
- 330 Portage Ave
  - Bank of Montreal
  - Rogers
- 340-350 Portage Ave — small two-storey structure
- Carlton Building (354 Portage Ave)
  - Portage Place Southside Shops
- Manitoba Hydro Place (360 Portage Ave)
- Portage Place
  - Prairie Theatre Exchange
- Free Press Building
  - IBM Canada
- Place Promenade
  - Somali Mall
- 400 Ellice Ave (Symcor Inc) (Via 400 Webb Pl)
- Fred Douglas Chateau (formerly Kiwanis Chateau)
- Fred Douglas Place (via Fred Douglas Chateau)
- YMCA/YWCA Downtown Winnipeg
- One Canada Centre (447 Portage Ave)
  - Investors Group Wealth Management
- Power Building (428 Portage Ave)
  - Tim Hortons
  - Downtown Winnipeg BIZ
- Former Hudson's Bay building and parkade

As was the case with the construction of Winnipeg Square, structural pads were built atop Portage Place to allow for future upward expansion. There is one atop each end, and there is currently a plan for an office and hotel tower to be built on the western pad.

=== St. Mary Skywalk ===
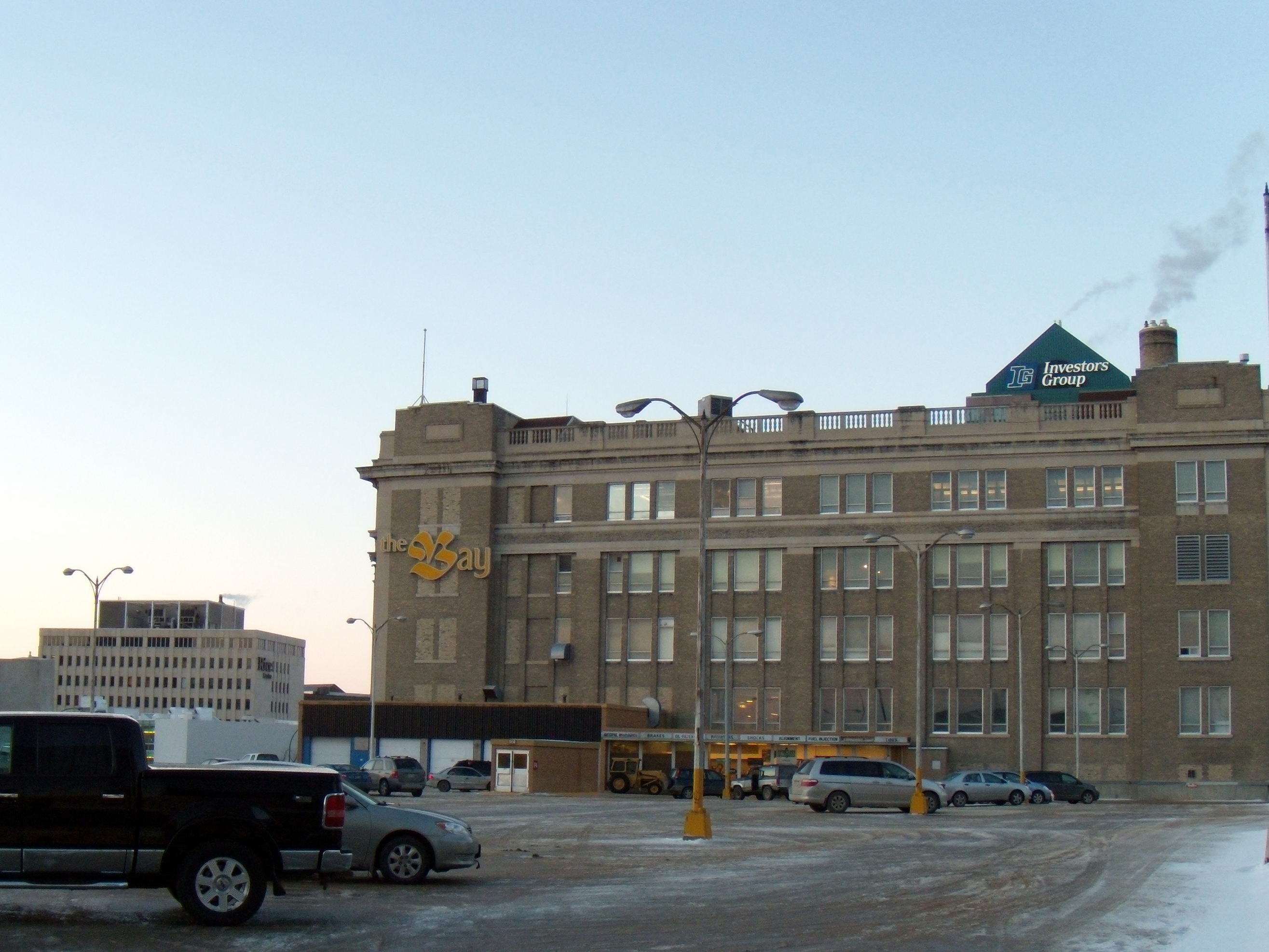
The top of The Bay parkade

The St. Mary Skywalk is both the smallest, and the most tenuously-linked segment of the Winnipeg Walkway System. Its only connection to the network is via the parkade of The Bay department store.

Beginning from The Bay parkade eastward, the Saint Mary Skywalk connects two buildings between Vaughan and Edmonton Street:

- 444 Saint Mary Ave — office building
  - Centra Gas
- 400 Saint Mary Avenue
  - ManpowerGroup

The western segment of the St. Mary Skywalk ends at 400 Saint Mary Avenue; however, it continues again from the RBC Convention Centre, whose entrance faces Edmonton Street, and connects into the Graham Skywalk via Cityplace.

==== Convention Centre ====
The connection between the pre-existing Convention Centre walkway system and the Winnipeg Walkway system was completed in 2010. When it was completed it became part of the St. Mary Skywalk. On the two blocks bordered by Edmonton Street, Saint Mary Avenue, York Avenue, and Hargrave Street is a residential and commercial complex consisting of the Convention Centre and the various buildings of Lakeview Square.

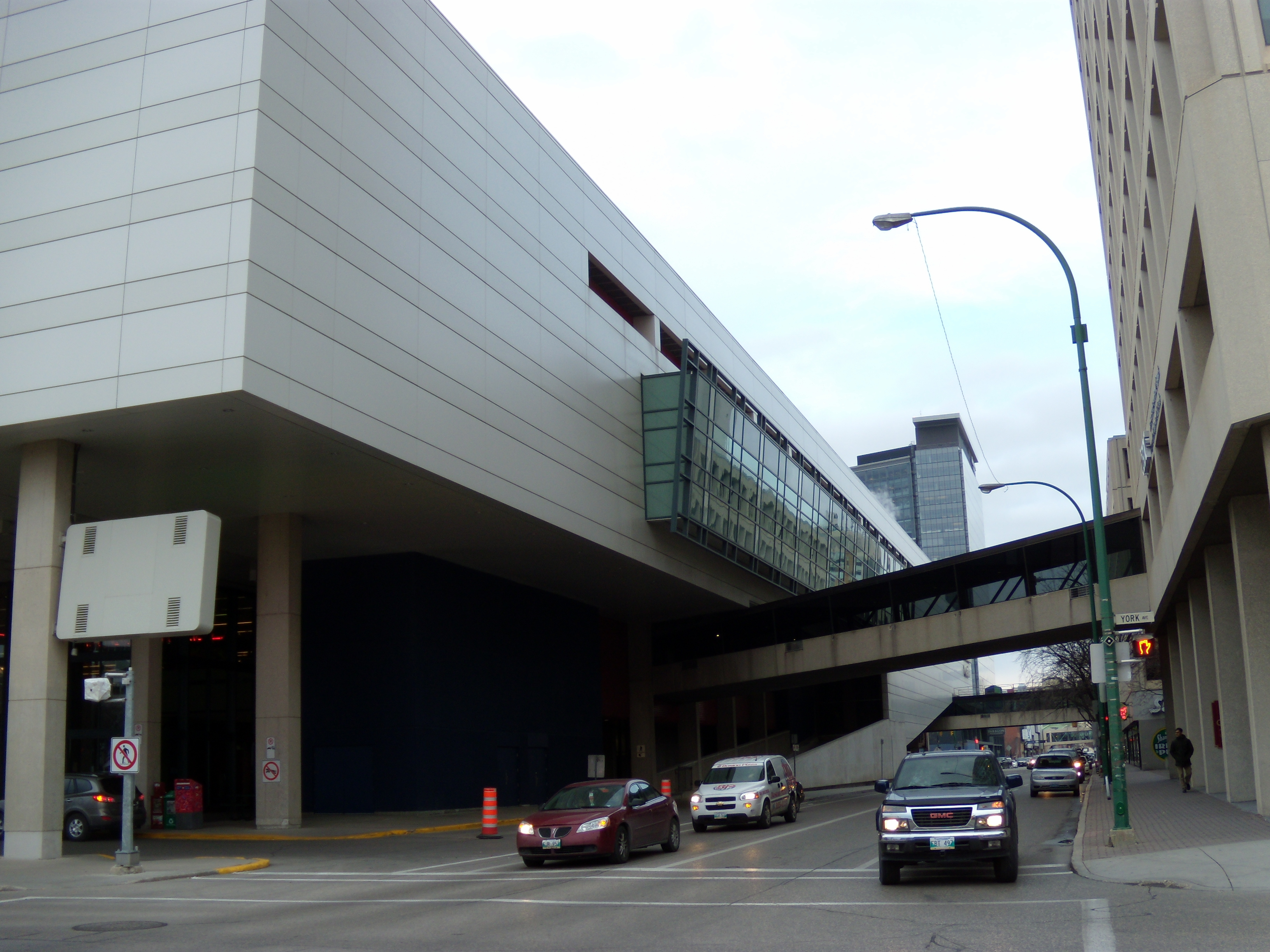
Winnipeg Convention Centre to Lakeview Square

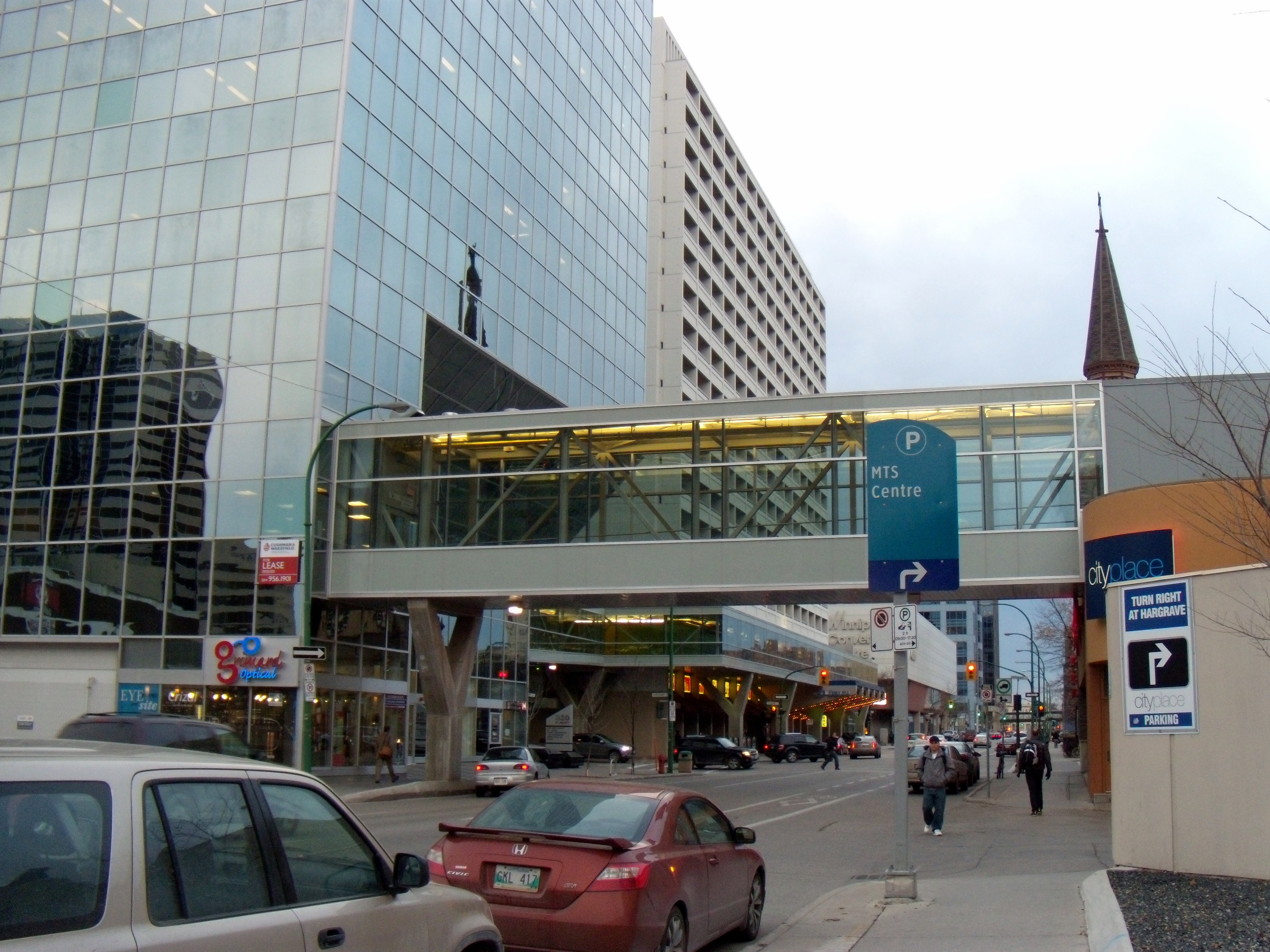
Skywalk section spanning St Mary Ave

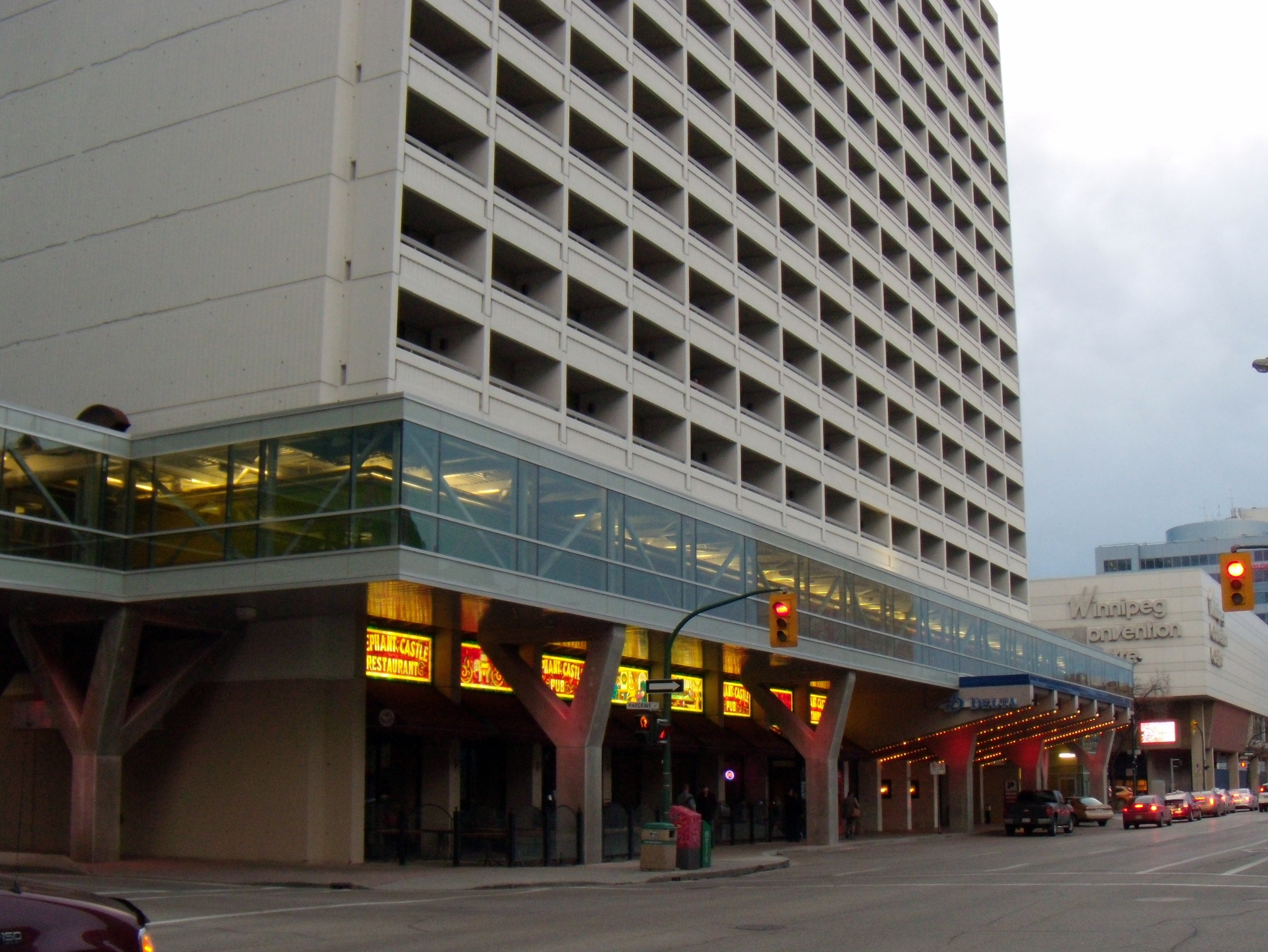
The Delta Hotel

A network of pedestrian tunnels and skyways connects the following buildings, from east to west:

- RBC Convention Centre
- Lakeview Square
  - 155 Carlton Street
    - Business Development Bank of Canada
    - various departments and agencies of the Government of Manitoba
    - East India Company Pub & Eatery (349 York Ave entrance)
  - 185 Carlton Street — office building
    - Shannon's Irish Pub (175 Carlton)
    - Ichiban Japanese Restaurant (189 Carlton)
  - Delta Hotels by Marriott Winnipeg (formerly Holiday Inn Crowne Plaza)
    - Elephant and Castle Pub and Restaurant
  - Holiday Towers
- 330 Saint Mary Avenue — office building
  - HSBC
  - Grimard Optical

The Convention Centre is connected by skyways to both 185 and 155 Carlton Street. The Lakeview Square development forms a 'U' around an open central courtyard which faces the Convention Centre across Carlton Street.

== Other downtown pedestrian networks ==
In addition to the Winnipeg Walkway, is another smaller enclosed pedestrian network in downtown Winnipeg that is not currently connected to the principal Walkway network.

=== Civic Centre ===
Another series of interconnected buildings straddle Main Street, approximately 1 km north of Portage and Main. On the west side of Main Street is the Winnipeg Civic Centre and on the east side is the Manitoba Centennial Centre. This pedestrian network's tunnels link the following public buildings:

- Winnipeg Civic Centre
  - City Hall
  - Administration Building
- Manitoba Centennial Centre
  - Centennial Concert Hall
  - Manitoba Museum
    - Manitoba Museum Science Gallery
    - Planetarium

Unlike the Convention Centre pedestrian network, creating a pedestrian link between the Civic Centre and the principal Winnipeg Walkway System is unlikely in the foreseeable future. Not only is the distance great between the Main Underground and the Civic Centre, but any connection between the two would require sensitive tunneling underneath turn-of-the-century heritage buildings over several blocks.
