= 201 Portage =

Office building in Winnipeg, Manitoba

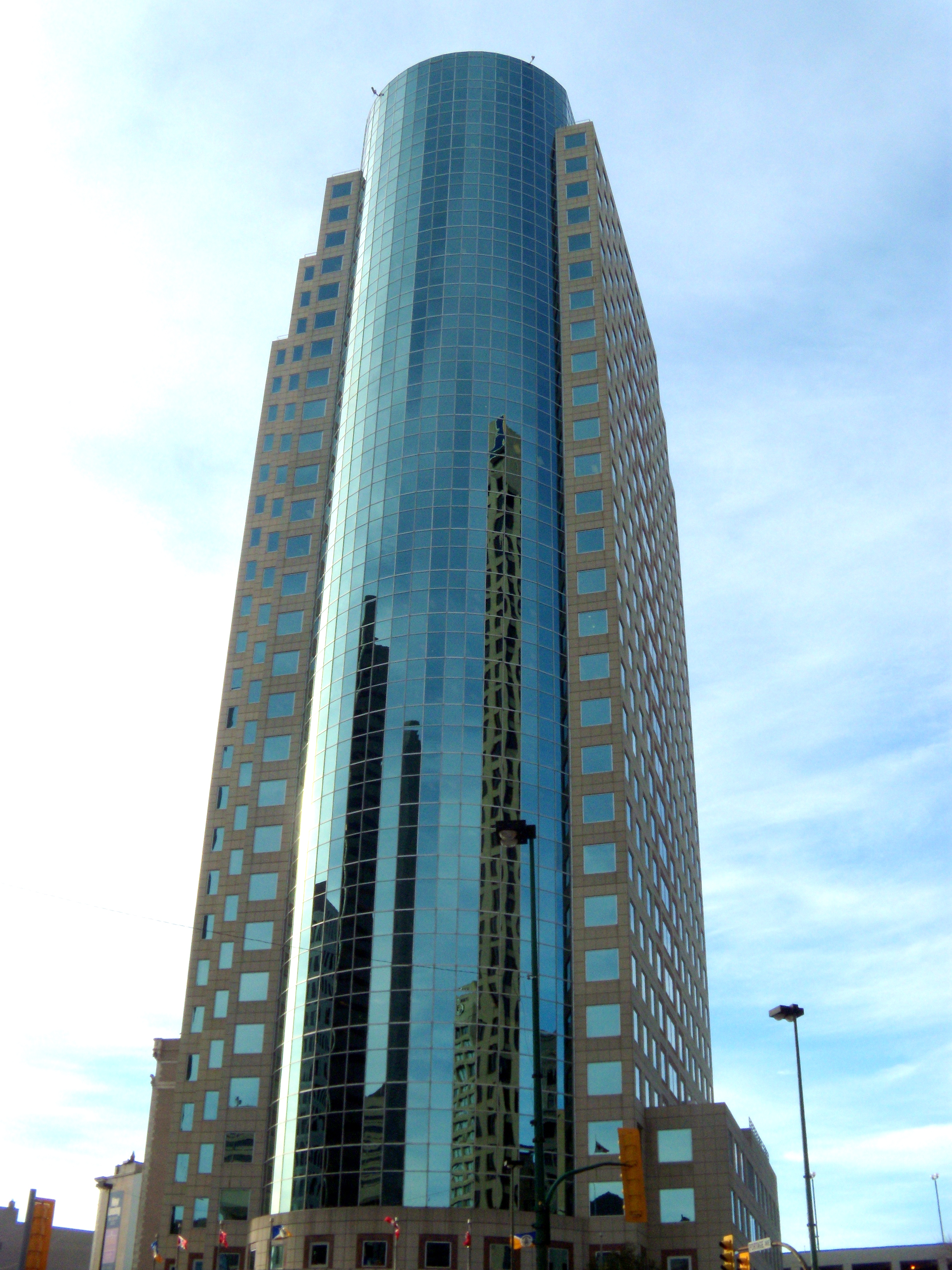
- Former names: TD Centre; Canwest Place; CanWest Global Place

General information
- Status: Completed
- Type: High rise building
- Architectural style: Modernism
- Location: 201 Portage Avenue, Winnipeg, Manitoba, Canada
- Coordinates: 49.8957°N 97.1393°W
- Construction started: 1988
- Completed: 1990
- Cost: $38,000,000

Height
- Height: 128 m (420 ft)

Technical details
- Floor count: 34
- Floor area: 50,818 m^{2} (547,000 sq ft)
- Lifts/elevators: 12

Design and construction
- Architecture firm: Charles Bentall Architects

Website
- www.201portage.com

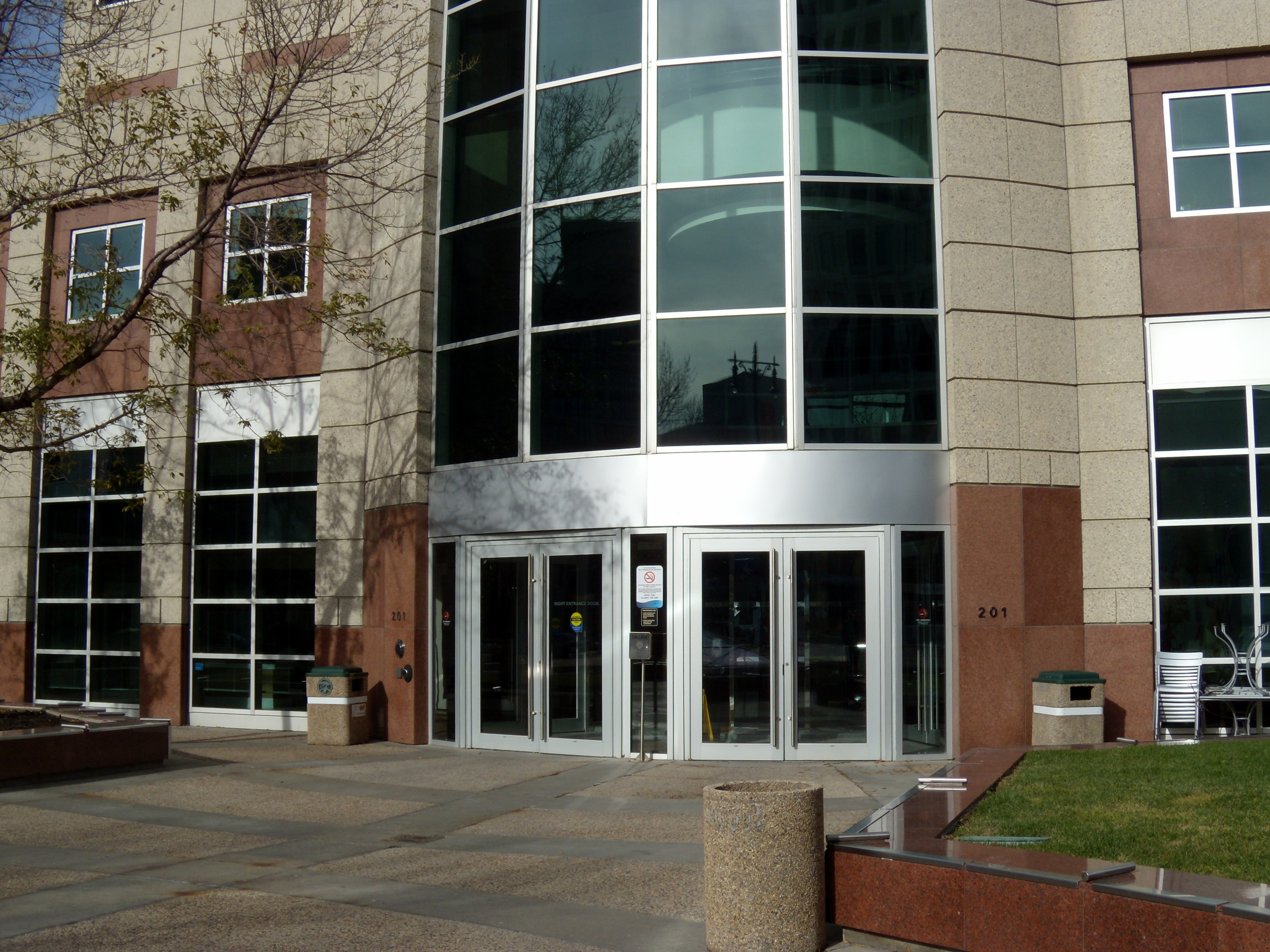
Entrance at Portage Ave, 201 Portage before renovations

201 Portage (formerly TD Centre, Canwest Place, and CanWest Global Place) is an office tower at the northwest corner of the Portage and Main intersection in Winnipeg, Manitoba, Canada. As of 2023, it is the second-tallest building in Winnipeg since the completion of the 300 Main Artis Reit Residential Tower, at 300 Main Street.

== History ==
Announced as TD Centre in November 1987, the 33-storey building was constructed between 1988 and 1990 by the Toronto Dominion Bank for $38,000,000. The construction of 201 Portage required the demolition of the Childs Building (also known as the McArthur Building) at 211 Portage. When the Childs Building was constructed in 1909, it was the tallest building in Winnipeg. The Childs Building had been 12 storeys above ground and 48.62 metres (159.5 ft) tall. A smaller twin building was planned but never built.

Originally built by the Toronto Dominion Bank, the skyscraper was acquired by Canwest to serve as the company's main corporate headquarters. Global Winnipeg (CKND-DT) moved its operations to 201 Portage on September 1, 2008. Having declared bankruptcy and sold its media properties, Canwest has vacated the premises. Its main successor, Shaw Media, retained only the lease for the 30th floor, where the Global Winnipeg studios are located. On 11 January 2011, the Canwest sign and logo were removed. The penthouse stayed vacant after Canwest's departure in November 2010 until late 2012, when RBC-Dominion Securities relocated to it from the Richardson Building.

As of 2013, the building is branded as "201 Portage." The building was managed by Creswin Properties, a real estate company privately owned by the Asper family, which owned Canwest, until early 2014. The building was acquired under new ownership in May 2014 and is owned by Portage & Main Development Ltd., a private corporation whose shareholders include 201 Portage Equities Inc. and Harvard Developments Inc.

Between 2021 and 2022, 201 Portage underwent $25+ million renovations, which included upgrades to the lobby, courtyard, ground-level facade, and all 12 elevators.

== Description ==
The 33-storey, 47,000-square-metre (510,000 sq ft) building stands 128 metres (420 ft) tall, making it the second-tallest building in Winnipeg. It is 3.9 metres (13 ft) taller than the Richardson Building, which is located across the street. It has been the tallest building between Hamilton and Calgary been since its construction. 201 Portage is connected to Winnipeg Square and the Winnipeg Walkway system via an underground concourse. The building is certified as BOMA BEST level 3.

== See also ==
- List of tallest buildings in Winnipeg
