= Winnipeg Commodity Exchange =

ICE Futures Canada (IFCA)—known as the Winnipeg Commodity Exchange (WCE) until 2008—was a derivatives market based in Winnipeg, Manitoba, and was Canada's only commodity futures exchange.

Prior to 2008, WCE was the subsidiary of WCE Holdings Inc., which also owned WCE Clearing Corporation, and Canadian Climate Exchange Inc. In 2007, WCE was purchased by the U.S.-based Intercontinental Exchange. In mid 2018, IFCA's futures and options contracts transitioned to ICE Futures U.S. (IFUS). Under the IFUS trading name, ICE continues to electronically trade Canadian contracts for milling wheat, durum, western barley, and canola (rapeseed).

ICE's operations in Manitoba are regulated by the Manitoba Securities Commission. In contrast, the Ontario Securities Commission has provided ICE an order that exempts it from the requirement to be recognized as a stock exchange and as a commodity futures exchange in Ontario.

== History ==
The Winnipeg Grain & Produce Exchange was established in 1887. Initially serving as a forum for cash trades in Canadian grains, it introduced its first futures contracts in 1904. Beginning with wheat futures, it subsequently added futures trading in barley, oats, flax, and rye. In 1908, the Exchange was re-organized as a voluntary, non-profit organization, changing its name to the Winnipeg Grain Exchange.

In 1972, with the opening of the market in gold futures, the Exchange was renamed the Winnipeg Commodity Exchange.

It also formerly operated the Canadian Financial Futures Market. In December 2004, WCE converted from the traditional "open outcry" method of trading to an electronic trading format, making it the first fully-electronic exchange in North America.

The privately-held WCE was purchased by the U.S.-based Intercontinental Exchange (ICE) in September 2007 for $40 million ($62.08 per common share), changing its name to ICE Futures Canada on 1 January 2008. Until December 2007, futures were traded on the platform of the Chicago Board of Trade. In mid 2018, IFCA's futures and options contracts transitioned to ICE Futures U.S. (IFUS). (The canola contract was the IFCA's last remaining futures commodity.) Brad Vannan was the president and CEO of ICE Futures Canada at the time.

== Buildings ==
The Winnipeg Commodity Exchange buildings past and current, have been located within downtown Winnipeg.

The first Commodity Exchange building was constructed in 1899 on Princess Street. The façade is now part of the Red River College Princess St. Campus.

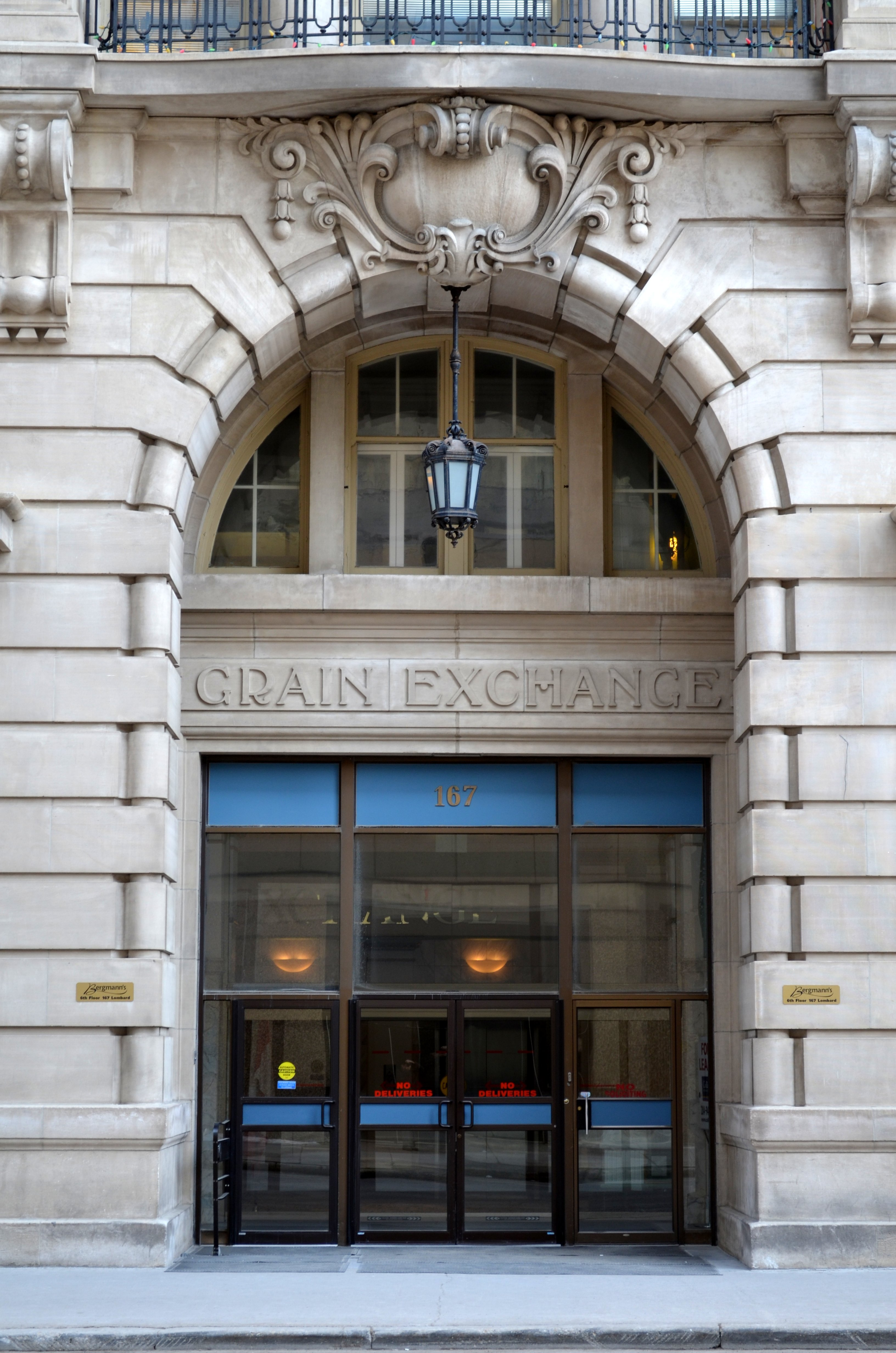
Entrance to the Grain Exchange building at 167 Lombard Ave

The second building was located at 167 Lombard Avenue and was constructed from 1906 to 1908 by Toronto-based architectural firm Darling and Pearson. It is still in use as office space, and known as the Grain Exchange Building.

The Winnipeg Commodity Exchange then moved to the Commodity Exchange Tower at 360 Main Street in 1979. In 2008, the tower was renamed to 360 Main after the Winnipeg Commodity Exchange was absorbed into the American-based Intercontinental Exchange.

The present 360 Main Street is home to the Underground Shops of Winnipeg Square. Locally, the building is also known as the Artis Building since it was originally developed by Trizec.

The building was completed in 1979 and is the fourth tallest building in the city, at 117 metres (384 ft) with 31 floors. The construction of the building originally planned to have a twin building with a hotel in the middle. The foundation for the other buildings were completed but the second tower was not built until 2022, when 300 Main was constructed. Architectural plans for the second tower were updated in the interceding period, so that the second building is not an identical match with the first building as originally planned. To date, the planned hotel has not been built.
