= List of tallest buildings in Winnipeg =

Skyline of Winnipeg
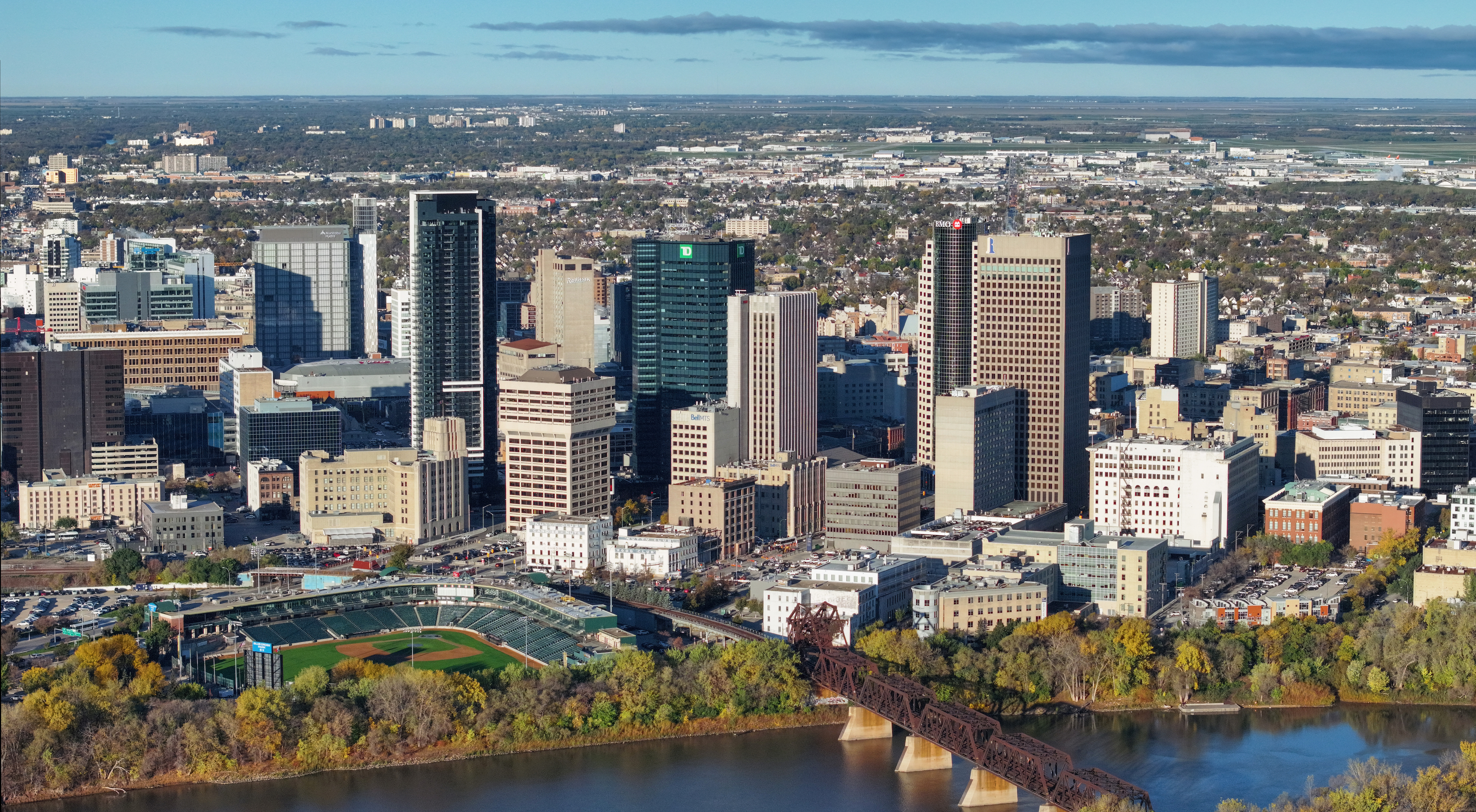
- Downtown Winnipeg in 2025
- Tallest building: 300 Main (2022)
- Tallest building height: 141.7 m (465 ft)

Number of tall buildings (2026)
- Taller than 75 m (246 ft): 24
- Taller than 100 m (328 ft): 6

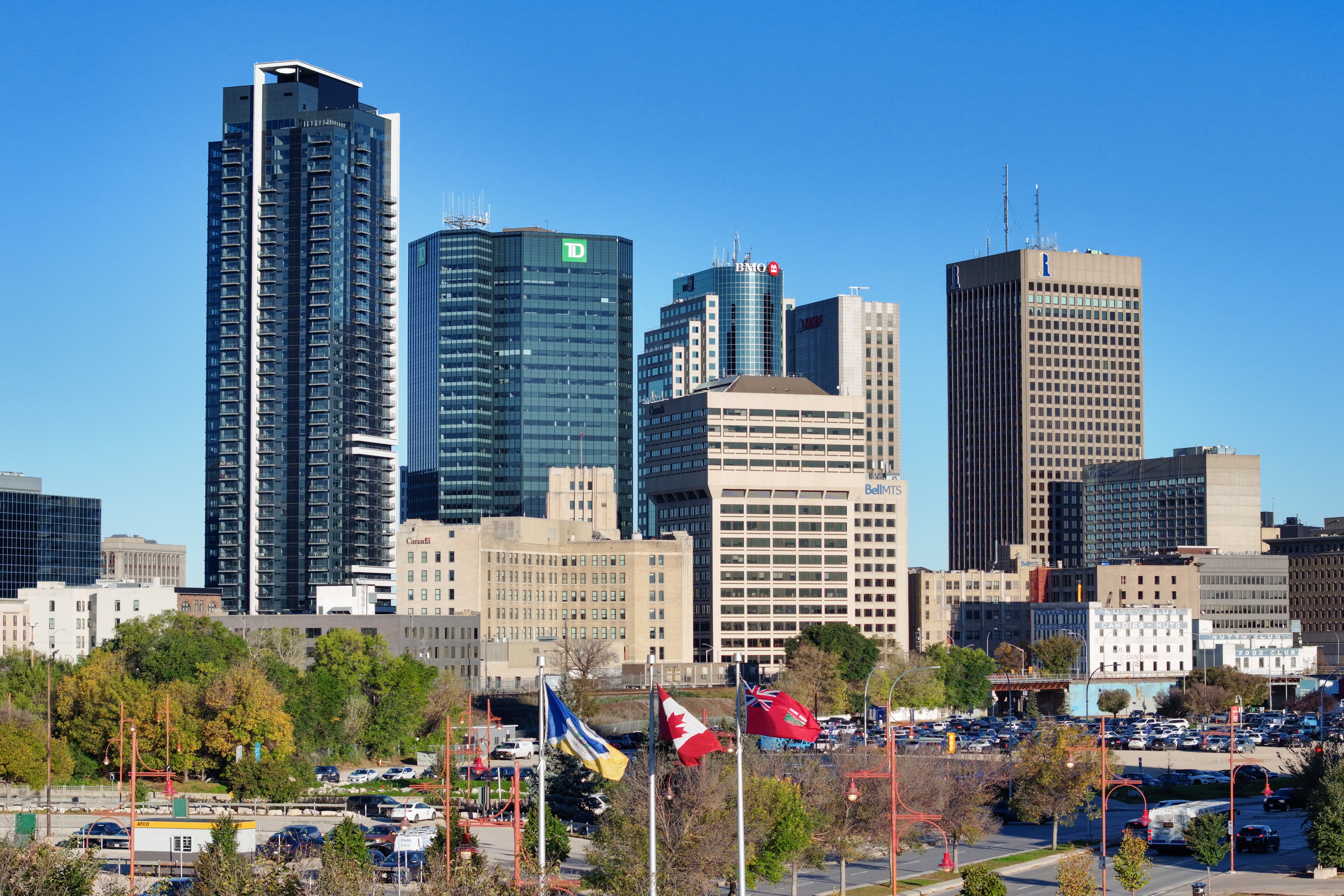
The four tallest buildings in Winnipeg are located on Main Street.

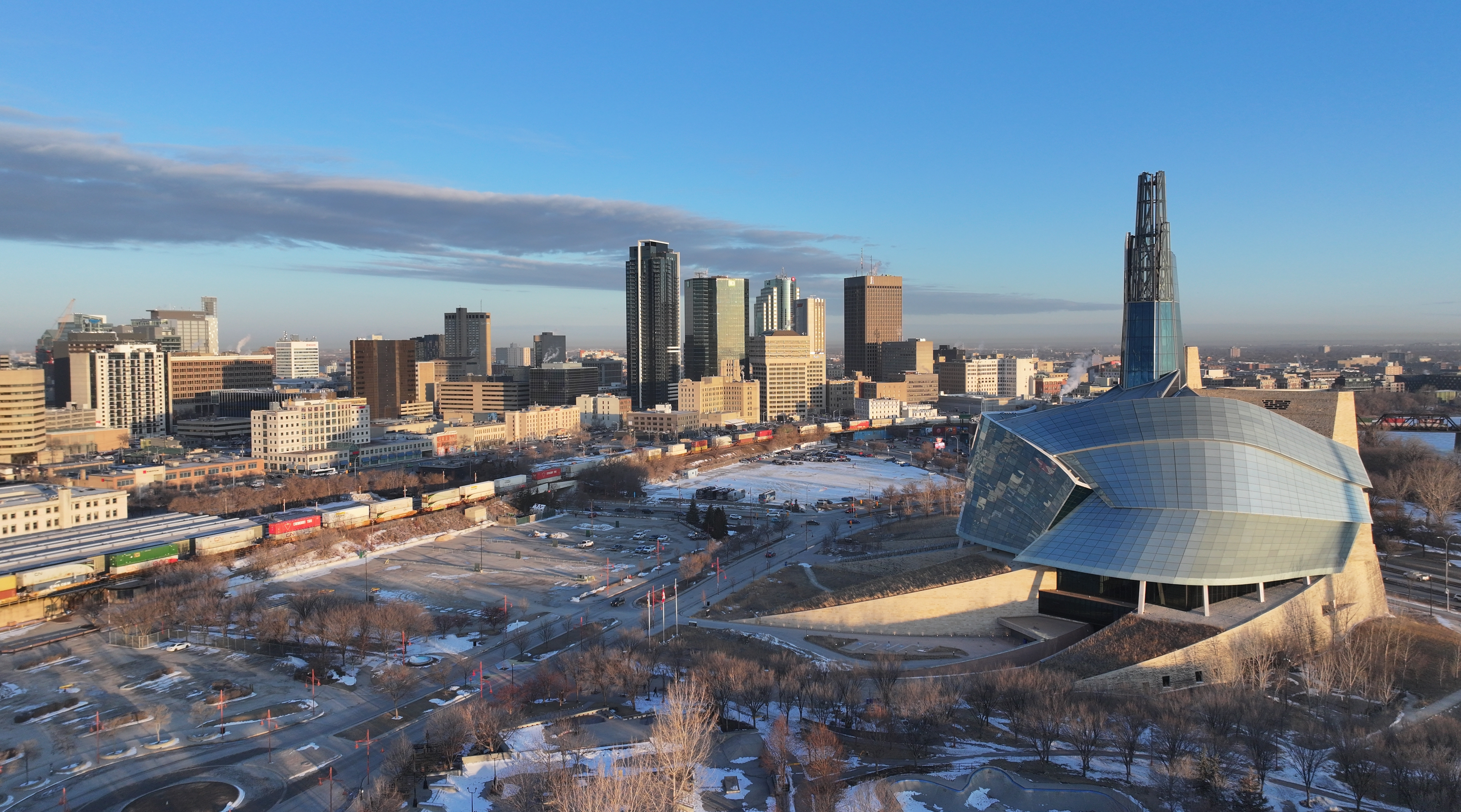
Winnipeg's skyline and the Canadian Museum for Human Rights in 2025

Winnipeg is the capital and most populous city of the Canadian province of Manitoba, with a metropolitan population of over 830 thousand as of 2021. As Manitoba's largest city by far, Winnipeg contains the vast majority of high-rises in the province. As of 2026, Winnipeg has 24 buildings that stand taller than 75 m (246 ft), six of which are taller than 100 m (328 ft). Winnipeg's skyline is the third-largest in the Canadian Prairies, after Calgary and Edmonton. The tallest building in Winnipeg is 300 Main, a 141.7 m (465 ft) tall multi-family residential tower completed in 2022.

As Canada's third-largest city in the early 20th century, Winnipeg is home to some of Canada's first high-rises. The 11-storey Union Bank Building, completed in 1904 for the Union Bank of Canada, is considered by some to be the first skyscraper in Canada. This early development boom was halted after the onset of World War I. Few high-rises were built between the 1920s and 1950s; from 1920 to 1969, the neoclassical Manitoba Legislative Building, the province's third legislative building, was the tallest structure in the city. A larger high-rise construction boom began in the 1960s and lasted until 1990, which saw the completion of office buildings such as the Richardson Building, 360 Main, and 201 Portage—the city's tallest building at 128 m (420 ft) from 1990 to 2022—and residential complexes such as Fort Garry Place and Holiday Towers.

Few tall buildings were completed in the 1990s and 2000s. A notable exception was Manitoba Hydro Place, the headquarters of Manitoba Hydro, an electric power and natural gas utility, in 2008. Another construction boom began in the 2010s. A significant recent project is True North Square, a public plaza and mixed-use development downtown. True North Square involves five towers spanning over 1 million square feet (93,000 m^{2}) of office, residential, retail, hotel, and public space; three towers have been built as of 2026. In addition, 300 Main surpassed 201 Portage to become the city's tallest building in 2022.

Most high-rises in Winnipeg are situated in Downtown Winnipeg, which is bordered by the Red River to the east and the Assiniboine River to the south. Winnipeg's four tallest towers are located near each other, just south of the Exchange District. There are several residential towers in the Roslyn and Osborne Village neighbourhoods south of downtown. The tallest of these is 55 Nassau North, the city's sixth-tallest building. In addition to its high-rises, Winnipeg's skyline notable for Canadian Museum for Human Rights, which features a glass spire that reaches 100 m (328 ft) in height.

== History ==
Number of buildings by height in Winnipeg by the end of each year, based on the information in this article. Click on the legend to toggle a specific height on or off. View chart definition.

Winnipeg's history of towers began with the Union Bank Tower (1904), the National Bank Building (1911), and the Hotel Fort Garry in 1913. Buildings in the city remained relatively short in the city until the late 1960s when the city experienced its first skyscraper boom, with the construction of the Richardson Building, Holiday Towers, and Grain Exchange Tower, all being constructed during this time. From 1980 to 1990, Winnipeg witnessed a major expansion of skyscraper and high-rise construction. Many of the city's office towers were completed during this period, such as Canwest Place and the Evergreen Place towers. A 20-year lull in building construction came after this expansion, though Winnipeg has experienced a much smaller second building expansion beginning in the late 2000s and continuing into the present.

The most recent tall building to be constructed in Winnipeg is 300 Main, which opened in 2023. The Canadian Museum for Human Rights, which opened in 2014, featured a spire that was 100 m (328 ft) tall. In March 2021, 300 Main became Winnipeg's tallest building during construction, surpassing 201 Portage.

== Cityscape ==
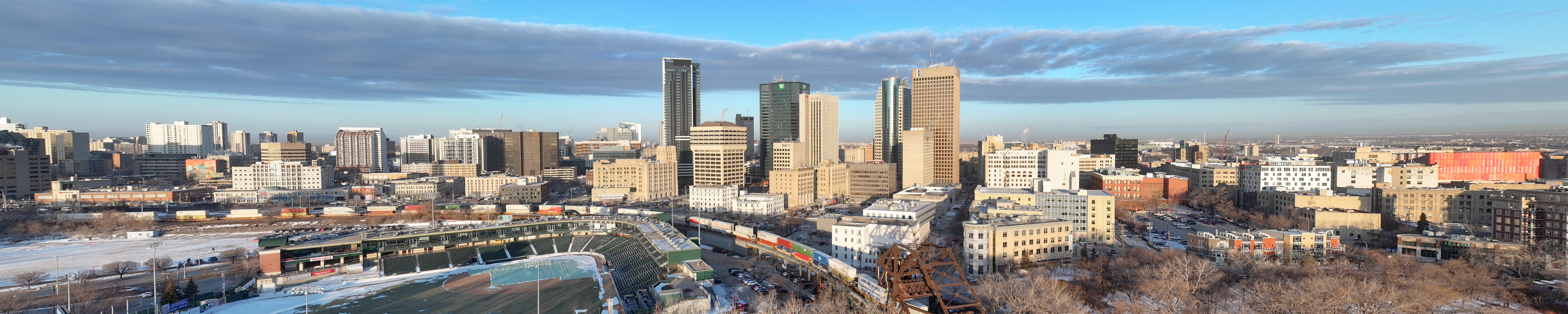
Skyscrapers in Downtown Winnipeg behind Blue Cross Park in 2025

== Map of tallest buildings ==
The map below shows the location of every building taller than 75 m (246 ft) in Winnipeg. Each marker is numbered by the building's height rank, and coloured by the decade of its completion.

Buildings taller than 75 m (246 ft) in Winnipeg.
- 1950s and before
- 1960s
- 1970s
- 1980s
- 1990s
- 2000s
- 2010s
- 2020s
1 300 Main
2 201 Portage
3 Richardson Building
4 360 Main
5 Manitoba Hydro Place
6 55 Nassau North
7 Radisson Hotel Winnipeg Downtown
8 Fort Garry Place III
9 Bell MTS Place I
10 Wawanesa Tower
11 225 Carlton
12 Heritage Landing
13 One Canada Centre
14 One Evergreen Place
15 Manitoba Legislative Building
16 390 on the River
17 Scotiabank Tower
18 Chateau 100
19 Fort Garry Place I
20 Holiday Towers South
21 Holiday Towers North
22 Seven Evergreen Place
23 Eleven Evergreen Place
24 Fort Garry Place II

== Tallest buildings ==
This list ranks completed buildings in Winnipeg that stand at least 75 m (246 ft) tall, based on standard height measurement. This includes spires and architectural details but does not include antenna masts. The “Year” column indicates the year of completion. Buildings tied in height are sorted by year of completion with earlier buildings ranked first, and then alphabetically.

Was the tallest building in Winnipeg upon completion

Rank	Name	Image	Location	Height m (ft)	Floors	Year	Purpose	Notes
1	300 Main	300 Main	49°53′37″N 97°08′17″W	141.7 (465)	42	2022	Residential	Tallest building in Winnipeg and in Manitoba. Tallest building completed in Winnipeg in the 2020s.
2	201 Portage	201 Portage Ave	49°53′44″N 97°08′22″W	128 (420)	33	1990	Office	Tallest building in Winnipeg from 1990 to 2022. Tallest building completed in Winnipeg in the 1990s. Tallest office building in Winnipeg. Formerly known as TD Centre, Canwest Place, and CanWest Global Place.
3	Richardson Building	Richardson Building	49°53′45″N 97°08′16″W	126.1 (414)	34	1969	Office	Tallest building in Winnipeg from 1969 to 1990. Tallest building completed in Winnipeg in the 1960s. First building in Winnipeg to exceed 100 m (328 ft) in height.
4	360 Main	360 Main tower	49°53′40″N 97°08′19″W	117 (384)	31	1979	Office	Tallest building completed in Winnipeg in the 1970s. Formerly known as the Commodity Exchange Tower from 1979 to 2010. Was reclad in glass in 2018 in a $25 million project.
5	Manitoba Hydro Place	Manitoba Hydro Place	49°53′31″N 97°08′46″W	114.9 (377)	22	2008	Office	Tallest building completed in Winnipeg in the 2000s.
6	55 Nassau North	55 Nassau	49°52′44″N 97°09′02″W	109 (358)	38	1970	Residential	Tallest residential building in Winnipeg from 1970 to 2022. Tallest building in Winnipeg outside of downtown.
7	Radisson Hotel Winnipeg Downtown	Radisson Hotel	49°53′37″N 97°08′33″W	98.5 (323)	29	1969	Hotel	Tallest hotel building in Winnipeg.
8	Fort Garry Place III	Fort Garry Place	49°53′14″N 97°08′11″W	98.2 (322)	31	1989	Residential	Part of the three-tower Fort Garry Place complex. Tallest building completed in Winnipeg in the 1980s.
9	Bell MTS Place I	MTS Place	49°53′41″N 97°08′15″W	96 (315)	24	1985	Office	
10	Wawanesa Tower	–	49°53′28″N 97°08′44″W	92.2 (302)	23	2024	Office	Tower 5 of True North Square. Headquarters of Wawanesa Insurance.
11	225 Carlton	–	49°53′29″N 97°08′41″W	87 (285)	25	2018	Mixed-use	Mixed-use office and residential building with retail space. Tallest building completed in Winnipeg in the 2010s. Tower 2 of True North Square.
12	Heritage Landing	–	49°53′08″N 97°08′14″W	86 (282)	25	2016	Residential	
13	One Canada Centre		49°53′30″N 97°09′01″W	83.2 (273)	18	1987	Office	
14	One Evergreen Place		49°52′52″N 97°09′01″W	82.9 (272)	29	1979	Residential	Also known as Number One Evergreen Place.
15	Manitoba Legislative Building	Manitoba Legislative Building	49°53′04″N 97°08′49″W	78.6 (258)	3	1920	Government	Houses the Legislative Assembly of Manitoba. Tallest building in Manitoba from 1920 to 1969. Tallest building completed in Manitoba in the 1920s.
16	390 on the River	–	49°53′03″N 97°08′26″W	78 (256) (Note: Sources do not state the exact height of this building. This figure was determined using Google Earth by subtracting the altitude of the building's lowest main pedestrian open-air entrance from its highest architectural point.)	24	2018	Residential	
17	Scotiabank Tower	–	49°53′28″N 97°08′38″W	78 (256)	17	2018	Office	Tower 1 of True North Square.
18	Chateau 100		49°53′12″N 97°08′24″W	77.7 (255)	26	1970	Residential	
19	Fort Garry Place I		49°53′13″N 97°08′09″W	77.7 (255)	25	1989	Residential	Part of the three-tower Fort Garry Place complex.
20	Holiday Towers South		49°53′20″N 97°08′34″W	77 (253)	26	1974	Residential	
21	Holiday Towers North		49°53′22″N 97°08′35″W	76.5 (251)	25	1973	Residential	
22	Seven Evergreen Place		49°52′52″N 97°08′58″W	76.5 (251)	26	1982	Residential	
23	Eleven Evergreen Place		49°52′52″N 97°08′55″W	76.5 (251)	26	1984	Residential	
24	Fort Garry Place II		49°53′12″N 97°08′11″W	75 (246)	24	1989	Residential	Part of the three-tower Fort Garry Place complex.

== Tallest under construction or proposed ==
=== Under construction ===
As of 2026, there are no buildings under construction in Winnipeg that are planned to be at least 75 m (246 ft) tall.

=== Proposed ===
As of 2026, there are no proposed buildings in Winnipeg that are planned to be at least 75 m (246 ft) tall.

== Timeline of tallest buildings ==
Was the tallest building in Canada upon completion

Name	Image	Years as tallest	Height m (ft)	Floors	Reference
Merchant's Bank Building		1900–1904	–	7	
Union Bank Building		1904–1909	47.6 (156)	11	
Childs / McArthur Building		1909–1913	48.6 (159)	12	
Hotel Fort Garry		1913–1920	58.5 (192)	14	
Manitoba Legislative Building		1920–1969	78.6 (258)	5	
Richardson Building	201 Portage on the left, with Richardson Building on the right	1969–1990	126.1 (414)	34	
201 Portage	201 Portage	1990–2022	128 (420)	33	
300 Main	300 Main, under construction	2022–present	141.7 (465)	42	

== See also ==
- Winnipeg arts and culture
- List of tallest buildings in Canada
- List of tallest buildings in Calgary
- List of tallest buildings in Edmonton
- List of tallest buildings in Saskatoon
- List of tallest buildings in Regina
