= Manitoba Hydro Place =

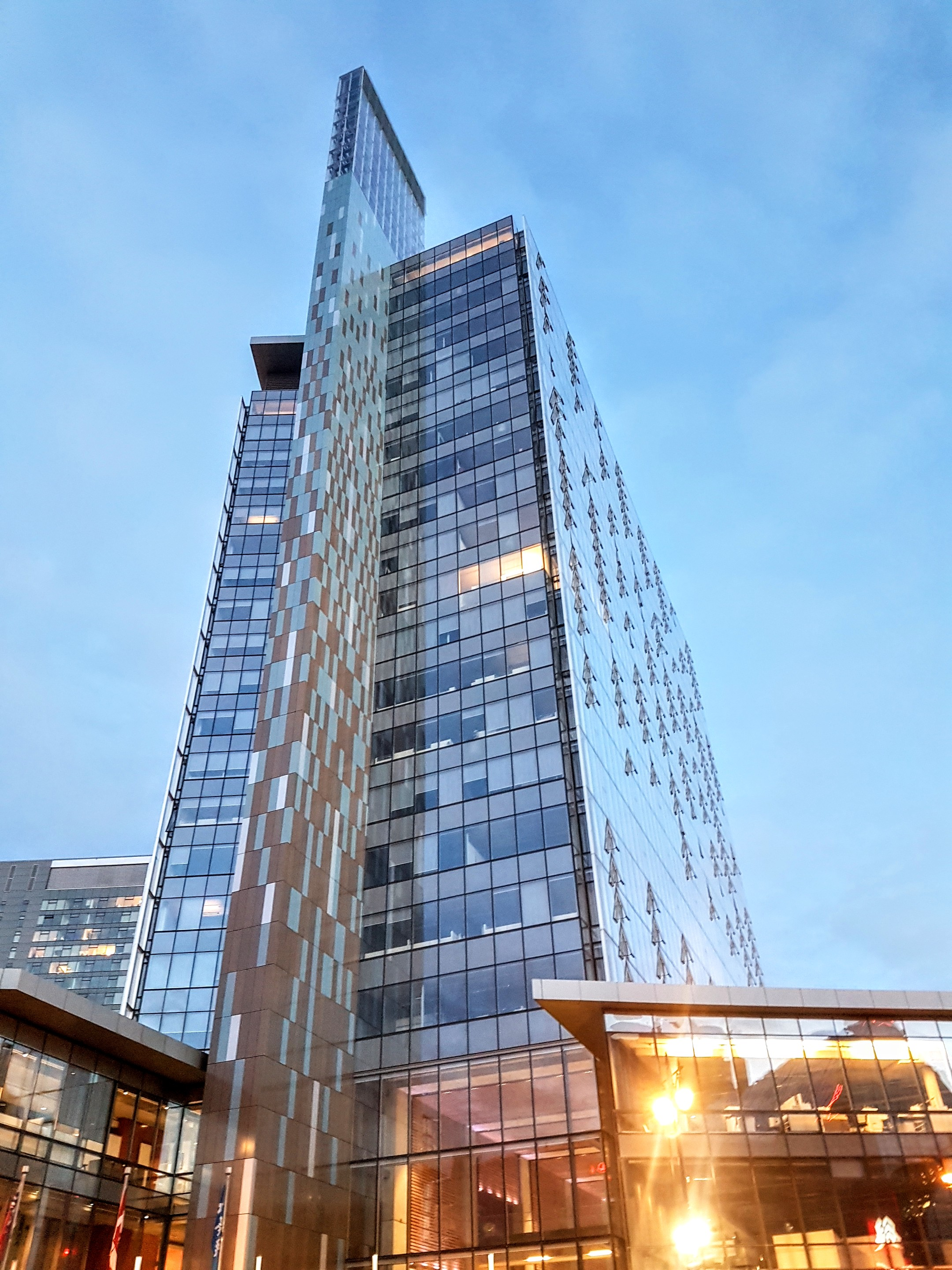
- Manitoba Hydro Place as seen from Portage Avenue, May 2022

General information
- Type: Office tower
- Location: 360 Portage Avenue; Winnipeg, Manitoba; R3C 0G8
- Coordinates: 49°53′32.63″N 97°8′47.04″W
- Construction started: August 2005
- Completed: December 22, 2008 (first occupancy)
- Opening: September 29, 2009
- Cost: C$278m.
- Owner: Manitoba Hydro

Height
- Roof: 377 ft (115 m) (solar chimney)

Technical details
- Floor count: 24 (22 + 2 Mechanical)
- Floor area: 695,250 sq ft (64,591 m^{2})

Design and construction
- Architects: Kuwabara Payne McKenna Blumberg Architects; Smith Carter Architects and Engineers Inc.
- Structural engineer: Crosier Kilgour/Halcrow Yolles
- Main contractor: PCL Construction Management

Manitoba Hydro Place (MHP) is an office tower serving as the headquarters building of Manitoba Hydro, the electric power and natural gas utility in the province of Manitoba, Canada. Located at 360 Portage Avenue in downtown Winnipeg and connected to the Winnipeg Walkway system, Manitoba Hydro Place received LEED Platinum certification in May 2012, making it one of the most energy-efficient office towers in North America.

Opened as Winnipeg's 4th tallest building in September 2009, the 21-story office tower brought together 1,650 employees from 15 suburban locations into one 695,000 sq ft (64,568 m^{2}) high-rise on a full, downtown block. With the design's plan view resembling a capital letter "A", the project comprises two 18-storey twin wings framing three 6-storey, south-facing atria (winter gardens). The design's stepped, three-storey, street-scaled podium contains retail space as well as an interior pedestrian street and a single level of parking, partially below grade — over which sit the atria, office wings and their 3-storey mechanical penthouse. Total project cost was C$278m.

The building's bioclimatic, energy-efficient design features a 377 ft (115 m) tall solar chimney, a geo-thermal HVAC system using 280 five-inch tubes bored 380 feet into an underground aquifer, 100% fresh air (24 hours a day, year-round, regardless of outside temperature) and a one-meter-wide double exterior wall with computer-controlled motorized vents that adjust the building's exterior skin throughout the day and evening. Together, the various elements of the design enable a 70% energy savings over a typical large office tower.

In 2009, CBC News called Manitoba Hydro Place one of "the most energy-efficient office towers in the world" and the Toronto Star called MHP the "most important building in Canada."

== Background and design process ==
Construction of a downtown headquarters building was integral to the 2002 purchase agreement between Manitoba Hydro and the City of Winnipeg for purchase of the formerly city-owned electric utility, Winnipeg Hydro.

Manitoba Hydro representatives toured to Europe to identify examples of energy efficient design a year prior to beginning the architect selection process.

Subsequently, the company assembled an integrated design team including members from the corporation itself along with the design architects, the architects of record, energy engineers, building system engineers, cost estimators, and project contractors — selecting the Design Architect first: Kuwabara Payne McKenna Blumberg Architects of Toronto. Smith Carter Architects of Winnipeg was the Architect of Record.

By December 2003, the design team had selected the final site, and by 2004, Manitoba Hydro unveiled a series of design concepts for the building, having created a design brief for the building:

Manitoba Hydro's new head office building in downtown Winnipeg will be a functional, state-of-the-art energy efficient (Power Smart) cost-effective structure that embodies and demonstrates Manitoba Hydro's commitment to sustainable development. While meeting the business needs of Manitoba Hydro, the office building will have a positive impact on the future of Winnipeg's downtown and be a source of pride for Manitobans. (Client Brief, 2004)

The brief was developed into a project charter defining the project's core principles and against which design concepts would be measured: that it would be flexible and adaptable to new technology and workplace changes, offer world-class energy efficiency, offer a signature design to enhance the image of the company and the city, help strengthen the city downtown, and be a solid financial investment.

The company committed one year to developing the building concept, using another year to ensure the concept integrated the key elements, including architectural, structural, energy performance, cost, constructability, and LEED factors. Sixteen alternatives were developed, subsequently reduced to three options from which the final concept was selected.

== Energy efficient design ==
To meet its initial design target, that of a sustainable, energy-efficient building, Manitoba Hydro Place (MHP) was developed using an Integrated Design Process to optimize the building's massing, orientation and exposed thermal mass and to use digital analysis and computerized building management systems to increase its efficiency. MHP integrates passive elements (e.g., the south-facing winter gardens, natural daylighting, and the solar chimney) as well as active systems (e.g., dimmable, programmable fluorescent lighting and a computer-operated building management system).

See: Conceptual diagram of building systems at MHP

Key specifics of the design include siting of the building to take advantage of prevailing winds and solar gain, minimizing north-facing surface area, using the building's south-facing atria to provide and precondition the building's constant fresh-air supply and using several 24-meter-tall waterfalls to humidify and dehumidify the fresh air intake. Green roofs at the base of the building use plants to reduce stormwater runoff and minimize the building's heat-island effect, including such native prairie plants as sweet grass.

The design uses the building's concrete thermal mass to mitigate extreme temperature swings and integrate radiant heating and cooling systems, with a solar chimney to provide 100% fresh air by moving exhaust air to the bottom of the chimney to combine with the atria's preconditioned air and preheat incoming cold air to within room temperature, and employing geothermal technology via a closed loop system of 280 boreholes, six inches in diameter (variously reported as five inches in diameter), 400 feet deep, located between elements of the foundation. The geo-thermal boreholes are filled with tubing carrying glycol, which extracts heat from the building in warmer months while warming the thermal mass of the floor slabs radiantly in colder months. Heat pumps and exchangers maximize the system's efficiency, providing conditioned water that is then circulated in tubes in the exposed ceiling slabs, providing 100% of the mechanical temperature conditioning.

MHB features a high performance building envelope with a glass skin that is effectively triple-glazed — where the interior layer is single-glazed and separated from the double-glazed exterior layer by a one meter wide buffer zone. Windows at the east and west include operable sashes of both motorized, centrally controlled panels in the outer glazing and manually operated panels at the inner glazing as — well as shading located in the interstitial space. The floor plan shapes themselves (also known as floorplates) of MHP are shallow, with a distance of 11 meters from the face of the building to its interior core, facilitating natural daylighting.

Other systems integral to the design include high ceilings to maximize natural lighting, exterior walls of low-iron glass for maximum solar gain, automated solar shading, raised floors with a displacement ventilation system, high-output lighting with occupancy and light sensors on each fixture, a computer-based building management system to coordinate operation of energy management and building systems as well as a group of green roofs at the building's podium.

To achieve personal comfort levels, users have access to the operable elements of the façade and receives natural lighting 80% of normal office hours. In addition to the operable sashes, users can control their immediate environment via task lighting, shading devices and user-operable floor grilles.

Incidental to the building design itself, another idea behind MHP was indirect energy savings the project would facilitate by combining 15 disparate company entities in a single downtown location. Before MHP opened, 95 percent of the employees commuted to work via automobile. After working at the new building for less than half a year, 50% of commuters were using forms of transportation other than the automobile.

== MHP energy use ==
MHP targets electric usage less than 100 kWh/m^{2}/a compared to 400 kWh/m^{2}/a for a typical large scale North American office tower, located in a more temperate climate.

Specifically, the average cold-climate Class A Canadian office uses 400–550 kWh/m^{2} per year. A typical office space in Manitoba uses 495 kWh/m^{2} per year. Five years before the MHB was designed the typical office space in Canada utilized used 550 kWh/m^{2} per year. Because of recent work to reduce energy consumption in Winnipeg, a typical office highrise in the city uses approximately 325 kWh/m^{2} annually. Current annual Canadian energy targets for Class A office towers are 260kWh/m^{2}.

MHP projected an annual use of 88 kWh/m^{2} per annum, exceeding the Model National Energy Code for Buildings (MNECB) by 66%.

The building targets Leadership in Energy and Environmental Design (LEED) certification at the platinum level, the highest level of a four tier rating system. On May 25, 2012, MHB was finally awarded formal certification, achieving LEED Platinum, the first office building in North America to do so. As part of their announcement, it was confirmed that their annual energy use is 85 kWh/m^{2}, slightly lower than anticipated.

== Cost ==
MHP was constructed at a cost of C$278 m, or $400 per square foot. This would place the cost of the building much higher than local building developers would typically target for a city that is not expanding rapidly. The building was also financed internally, with a target construction payback period of more than 60 years rather than the much shorter typical return projection.

During the initial phase of construction, in 2006, engineers discovered a higher water table than anticipated. As the basement had originally been designed to accommodate numerous mechanical systems, the building underwent substantial redesign, including its foundation. A level of the basement was also eliminated during the redesign.

== Awards ==
- 2009 Council on Tall Buildings and Urban Habitat (CTBUH)'s Best Tall Building Americas award. At the time, CTBUH said Manitoba Hydro Place "was designed to be completely site specific. The design could not be transplanted to another city and still work, thus making it the perfect response to the seeming homogenization of the world's skylines."
- 2008 IBS Award, Highly Commended
- 2009 Building of the Year, Office Category by Arch Daily.
- 2010 American Institute of Architects Committee on the Environment (COTE), Top Ten Green Buildings.
- 2010 Sustainable Architecture & Building Magazine Award, Project Winner
- 2010 Royal Architectural Institute of Canada, National Urban Design Award
- 2010 the SAB (Sustainable Architecture and Building) Canadian Green Building Award.
- Engineers Canada – National Project Achievement Award
- 2010 ACEC Canadian Consulting Engineering Award – Buildings
- 2011 Royal Architectural Institute of Canada, Innovation in Architecture
- Canadian Consulting Engineering – Award of Excellence
- Association of Consulting Engineering Companies – Manitoba (Consulting Engineers of Manitoba) – Keystone Award and Award of Excellence
- Consulting Engineers of Alberta – Award of Excellence Sustainable Design

== Gallery ==
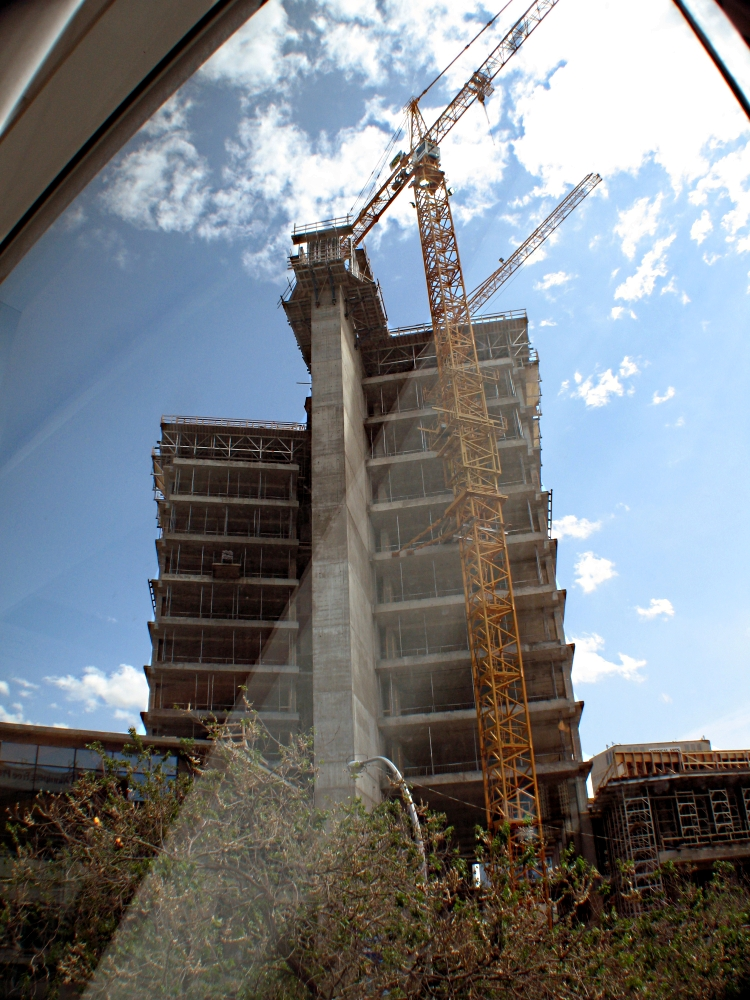
June 2007

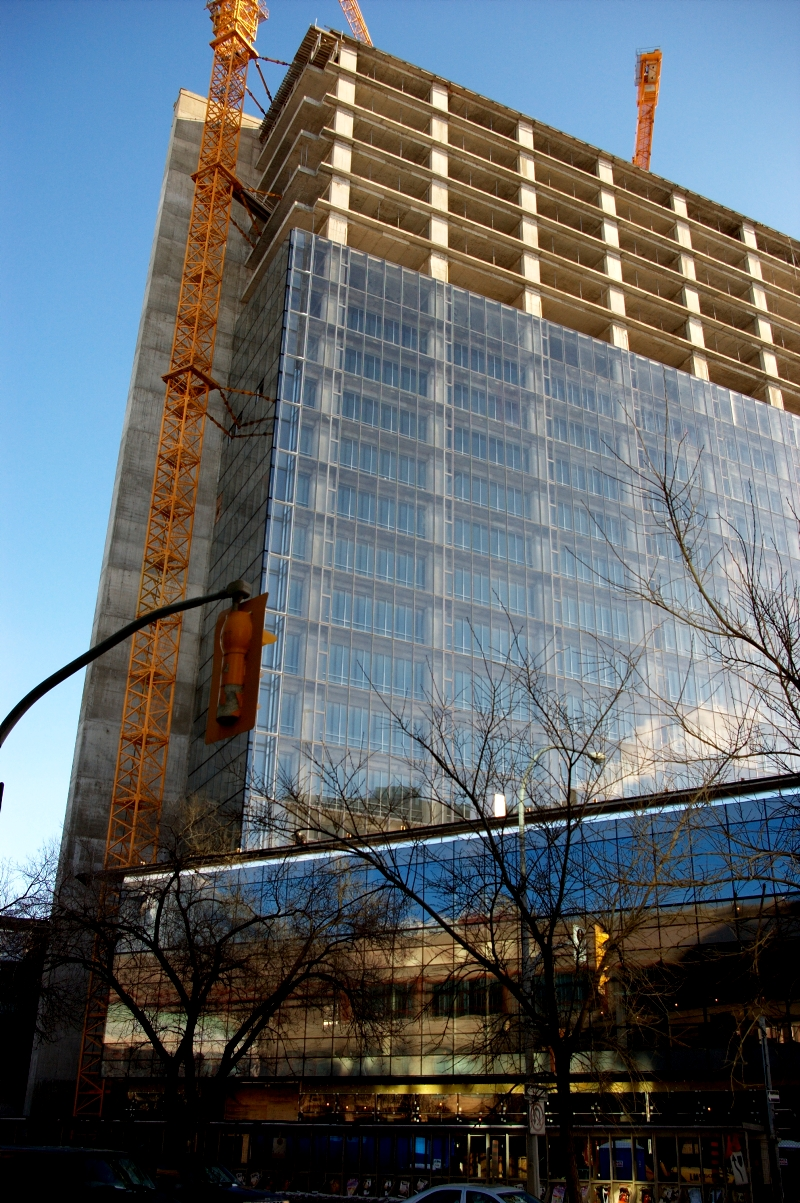
January 2008

== See also ==
- List of tallest buildings in Winnipeg
