= True North Square =

Mixed-use complex in Winnipeg, Canada

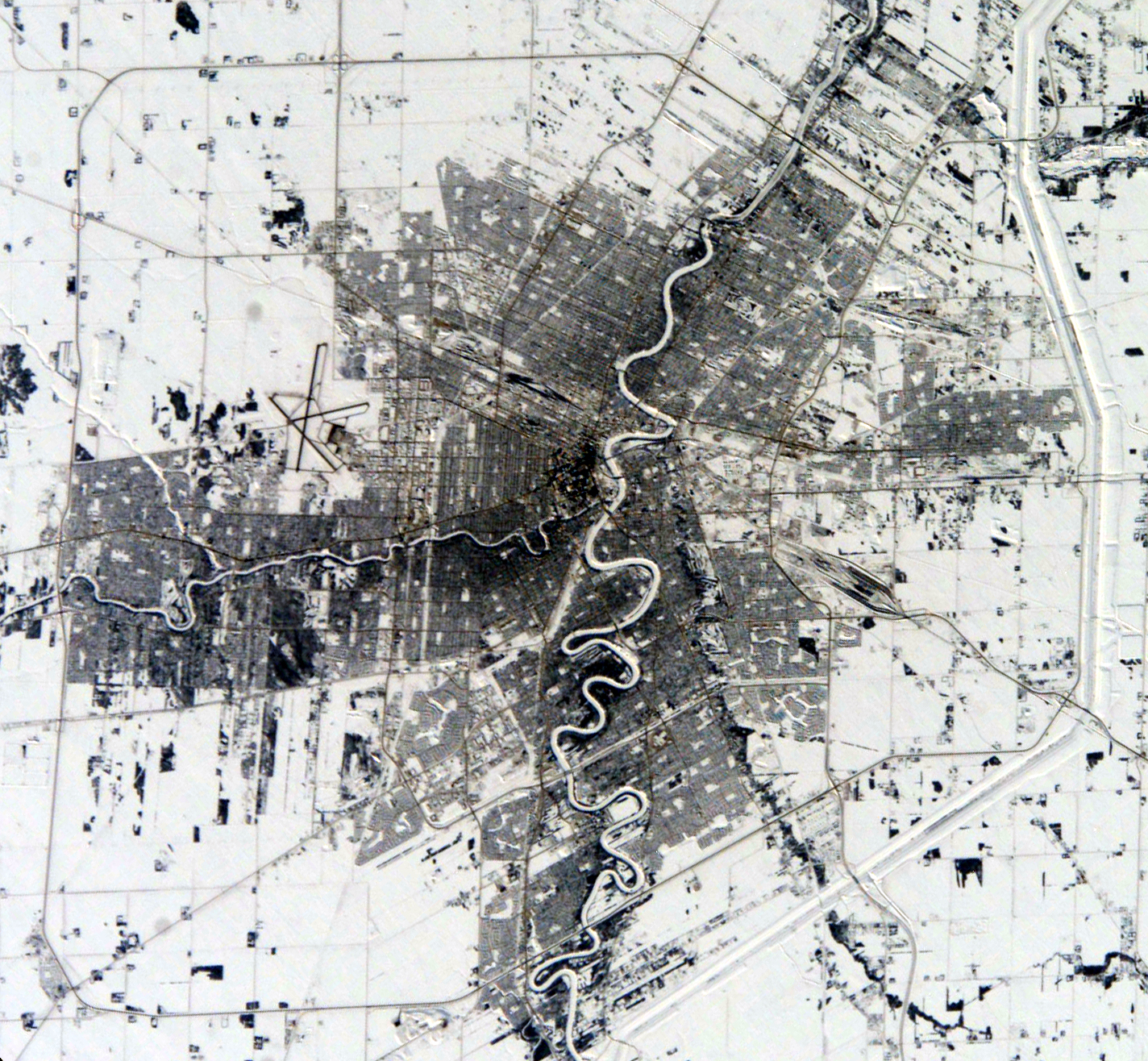
- Location within Winnipeg

General information
- Status: Under construction
- Type: Public square, Hotel, Condominium, Office, Retail
- Location: 220 Carlton St. 225 Carlton St. 242 Hargrave St. Winnipeg, Manitoba, Canada
- Coordinates: 49°53′29″N 97°08′40″W
- Current tenants: Hargrave St. Market; Scotiabank; MNP; Thompson Dorfman Sweatman
- Construction started: 2015
- Estimated completion: 2023
- Owner: True North Real Estate Development (True North Sports & Entertainment; James Richardson & Sons)

Technical details
- Floor count: 17 (tower 1); 24 (tower 2); 27 (tower 3); 17 (tower 4); 19 (tower 5)
- Grounds: 2 acres (0.81 ha)

Design and construction
- Architects: Perkins and Will; Architecture49
- Main contractor: PCL Construction

Other information
- Parking: 2-level, 238-stall underground parkade

Website
- www.truenorthsquare.com

True North Square is a public plaza and mixed-use development in downtown Winnipeg, Manitoba. Managed by True North Real Estate Development, a joint venture between James Richardson & Sons and True North Sports & Entertainment, it is still under construction, with two buildings officially complete and open.

True North Square is situated between Canada Life Centre and RBC Convention Centre, in the city's unofficial sports and entertainment district.

The True North Square is set to feature four towers in total, spanning over 1 million square feet (23 acres) of office, residential, retail, hotel, and public space. The first tower, located at 242 Hargrave Street, opened in June 2018 as a 17-storey Class A office and retail building, becoming the first privately developed office building in Winnipeg since 1990. It was joined in July 2019 by the second tower, located at 225 Carlton Street, which is a 25-storey residential rental building with complementary office and retail spaces.

== Development ==
Plans for a new square were revealed in June 2015 when True North Sports & Entertainment (TNSE) confirmed its purchase of the former Carlton Inn site from CentureVenture Development Corporation. At the same time, TNSE negotiated an agreement to acquire the land at 225 Carlton Street from Manitoba Liquor & Lotteries Corporation. The full details for the $400-million CAD project were unveiled in February 2016.

The City of Winnipeg directed $17.6 million towards the project, which included funding for the plaza as well as integrating True North Square into Winnipeg's existing skywalk network. The provincial government also committed $9 million in funding towards the project.

In 2018, Winnipeg City Council voted to have TNSE pay 10% of its annual property taxes on 220 and 225 Carlton Street (Sutton Place Hotel and Residence) towards affordable housing initiatives in Winnipeg, amounting to between $185,000 and $200,000.

== Features ==
True North Square is situated between the Canada Life Centre and RBC Convention Centre, in the city's unofficial sports and entertainment district.

=== Public plaza ===
True North Square plaza is a privately-owned publicly-accessible space. It encompass two acres south of Graham Avenue, between Hargrave and Carlton Streets. The public park and plaza features an outdoor stage and a skating rink during the winter months. The plaza opened in September 2018.

A statue of former Winnipeg Jets captain and Hockey Hall of Fame-inductee Dale Hawerchuk was unveiled at the plaza on October 1, 2022.

=== Towers ===
The True North Square is set to feature four towers in total, spanning over 1 million square feet (23 acres) of office, residential, retail, hotel, and public space.

==== Tower One (242 Hargrave St.) ====
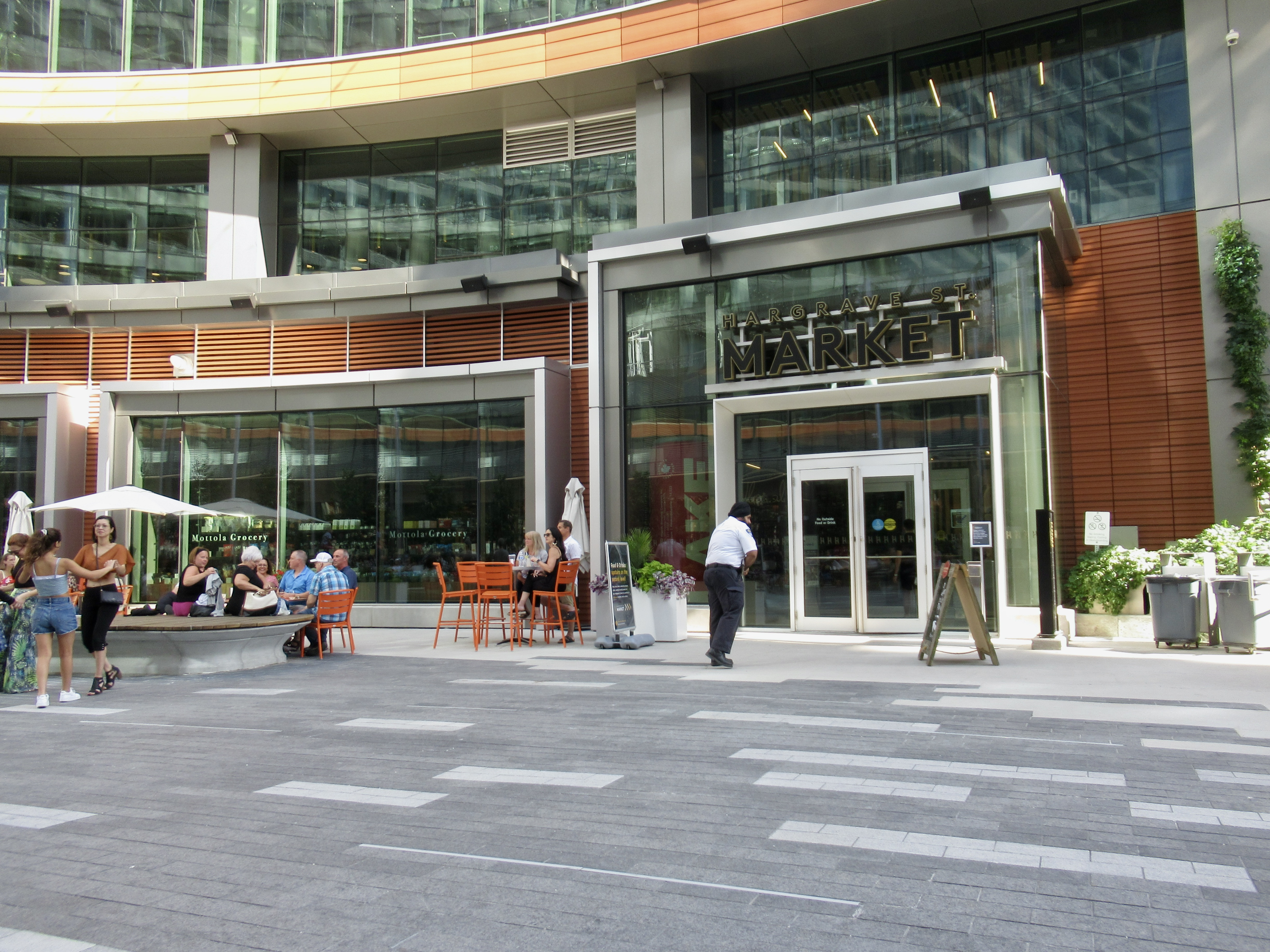
The exterior of Hargrave St. Market at True North Square

The first tower is a 17-floor Class A office and retail building located on the south side of the site at 242 Hargrave Street. Completed in June 2018, it was the first privately developed office building in Winnipeg since 1990.

The tower offers approximately 365,000 ft^{2} (33,900 m^{2}) of office space. It currently houses Scotiabank's new regional head office, as well as locally based law firm Thompson Dorfman Sweatman and technology company Ceridian. SkipTheDishes announced in November 2019 the moving of their headquarters to True North Square in December of 2020. The move would consolidate their staff, while maintaining a second city location at 140 Bannatyne Avenue for their 24/7 operations team. SkipTheDishes would occupy 95,000 square feet (8,800 m^{2}) of Tower One, spanning four-and-a-half floors.

A new food hall, Hargrave St. Market, opened on the second floor on 13 December 2019 and features local and regional restaurants. Currently, the restaurants of Hargrave Street Market include Gusto North, Yard Burger, The Good Fight Taco, Saburo Kitchen, Fools + Horses, and Miss Browns, as well as the Rose Bar and Lake of the Woods Brewing Company. On the first floor of Hargrave St. Market is an epicurean grocery store called Mottola Grocery.

==== Tower Two (225 Carlton St.) ====
Tower Two is located at 225 Carlton Street, adjacent to the plaza. Its construction beginning in 2016, the tower opened in July 2019 as a 25-storey residential rental building featuring 200,000 square feet (19,000 m^{2}) of complementary commercial and residential space.

In 2018, the Manitoba government decided to go ahead with plans to move the Manitoba Liquor Mart from Cityplace mall to True North Square. The old Liquor Mart at Cityplace closed in January 2020, when the newer larger store opened at 225 Carlton Street.

==== Tower Three and Four (220 Carlton St.) ====
The Sutton Place Hotel is set to occupy the 27-floor Tower Three at 220 Carlton Street. The hotel will be built on the site of the former Carlton Inn, which was purchased and demolished by the city in 2014. The hotel is currently under construction. A Chop Steakhouse & Bar will lease a portion of the 8,000 ft^{2} (740 m^{2}) on the main floor of the Hotel.

Tower Four will become the Sutton Place Residence, a 17-floor residential building. Construction has been on hold as of 2021 and is set to be complete in 2026.

==== Tower Five ====
Wawanesa Insurance announced in June 2019 that 1,100 employees will move from 191 Broadway and five other locations to a new office tower at True North Square. Tower 5 will be 23-storeys tall and will provide 300,000 ft^{2} (28,000 m^{2}) of office space. To accomplish this project will require the demolition of the former Hull's bookstore and the Royal Winnipeg Ballet dormitory building behind it. A new RWB dormitory will be constructed at a location to be determined. Tower Five is scheduled for completion by 2023 and will have skywalk connections to the rest of the TNS development and main floor access to the Graham Avenue Transit Mall.

== See also ==
- List of tallest buildings in Winnipeg
