= 360 Main (Winnipeg) =

Hi-rise office building downtown Winnipeg, Canada

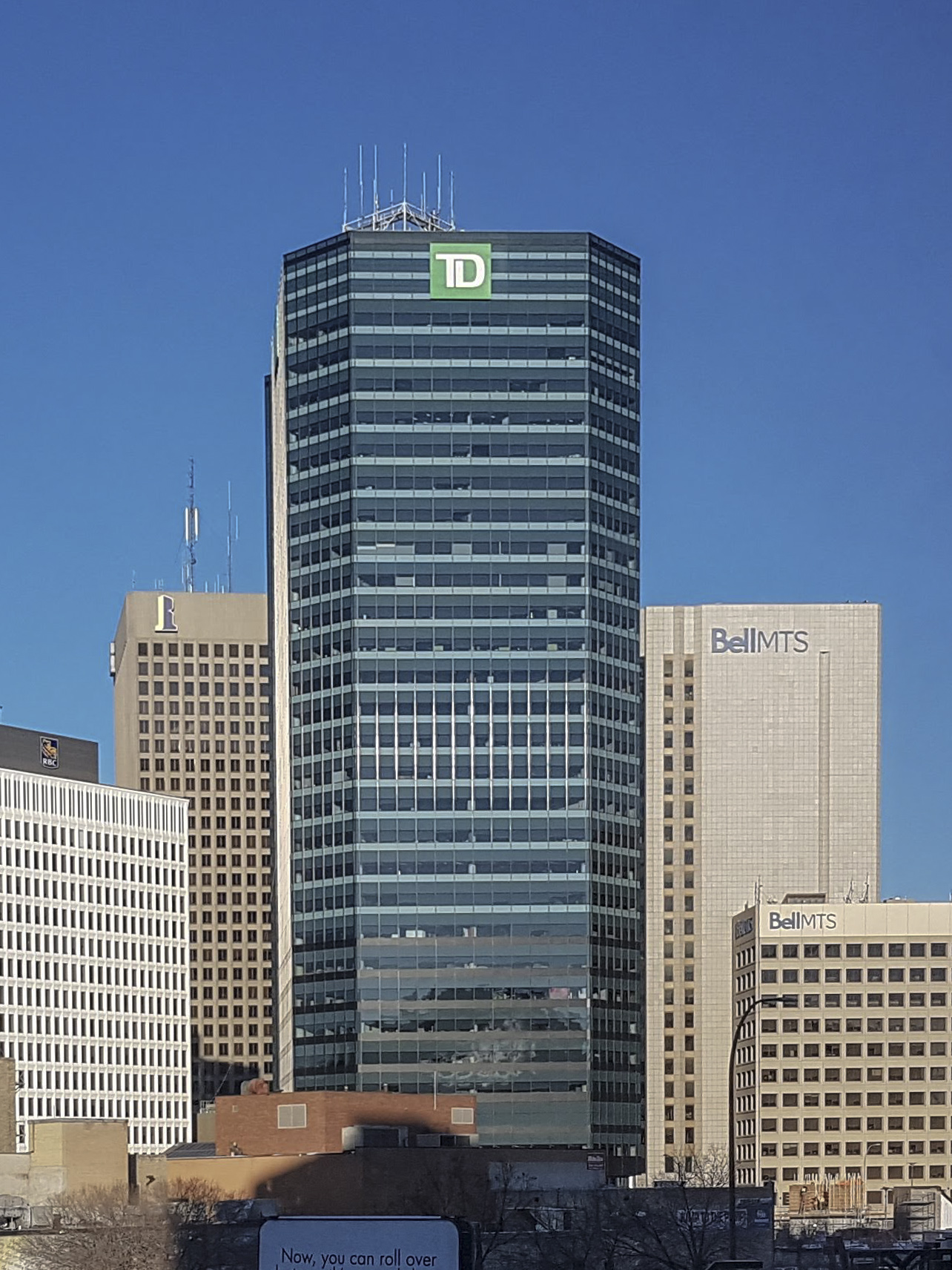
- 360 Main tower
- Former names: Commodity Exchange Tower
- Alternative names: Trizec Building

General information
- Location: 360 Main St, Winnipeg, Manitoba, Canada
- Coordinates: 49.8940°N 97.1385°W
- Current tenants: TD Bank, Shoppers Drug Mart, Filmore Riley, Pitblado, MLT Aikins, and others
- Construction started: 1971
- Completed: 1978
- Renovated: 2018-2019
- Renovation cost: $25 million (reclad)
- Landlord: Artis REIT

Height
- Height: 117 m (384 ft)

Technical details
- Floor count: 31
- Floor area: 59,000 m^{2} (640,000 sq ft)
- Lifts/elevators: 10 (5 low-rise & 5 high-rise)

Design and construction
- Architecture firm: Smith Carter Parkin; Arcop Associates
- Developer: Trizec Corporation
- Main contractor: V. K. Mason Construction Limited
- Awards: BOMA Level 3 (2011); LEED Canada Gold (2015)
- Known for: Winnipeg Square

Other information
- Parking: 936 Underground, 18 Surface

Website
- 360main.ca

360 Main is a 32-storey office tower located at Portage and Main in downtown Winnipeg, Manitoba.

It is connected to the Winnipeg Square underground mall and the Winnipeg Skywalk.

360 Main & Shops of Winnipeg Square comprises 597,755 square feet of leasable area, of which 55,284 square feet is the retail component of Winnipeg Square. The property has 954 parking stalls.

Currently owned by Artis REIT, a real estate investment trust from Winnipeg, the building was originally home to the Winnipeg Commodity Exchange and was known as the Commodity Exchange Tower. Although the naming rights expired in 1990, it was not officially renamed to 360 Main until 2010. Throughout this time, it has been unofficially known as the Trizec Building.

== Architecture ==
Initial announcements of 360 Main were that it would be the office component of the larger Winnipeg Square development by Trizec Corporation, comprising a 20-storey office tower for Scotiabank headquarters costing $7.5 million and an underground parkade-office-hotel structure costing $14.8 million. Construction took place in 1978, with Smith Carter Parkin as the principal architects. The building was certified as BOMA Best Level 3 in 2011.

== History ==
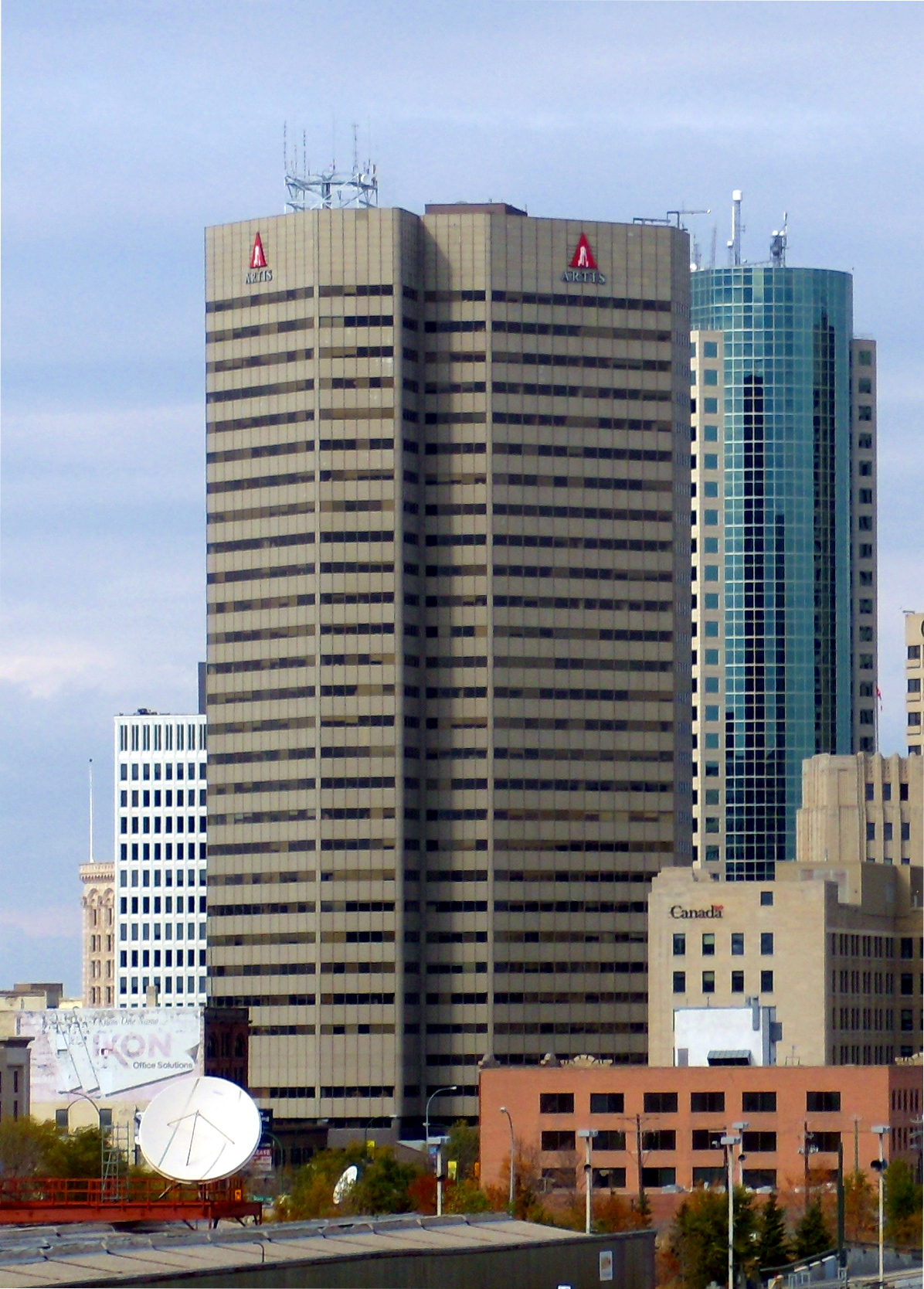
360 Main tower before 2018 glass recladding

The tower was purchased from Oxford Properties Group and GE Capital Canada Inc in September 2007 by Crown Realty Partners, a Toronto-based company. The purchase included the Winnipeg Square shopping mall and totalled approximately $102.5 million. 360 Main is currently owned by Artis REIT, a real estate investment trust from Winnipeg.

In late 2016, Artis REIT announced that the exterior 360 Main would be completely reclad in glass. The reclad project cost $25 million and was completed in 2018.

Additionally, the pad to the south would finally be developed as 300 Main, where a 42-storey apartment building would be constructed. Construction is ongoing now, with completion estimated for 2021. It will stand at 465 feet (142 m), the new tallest building in Winnipeg.

A new building between the 300 Main apartment complex and the 360 Main office tower, 330 Main, will become a GoodLife Fitness gym and Earls restaurant.

In January 2015, the building gained a LEED Canada Gold Certification and became the first LEED-certified existing building in Manitoba.

== Major tenants ==
Originally the purpose of 360 Main St. was to house the Winnipeg Commodity Exchange and associated trading companies and government departments. In the 2000s most of the original commodity trading companies merged or moved out.

As of September 2021, major tenants of 360 Main include BMO Nesbitt Burns, Canada Revenue Agency, Canadian National Railway, Deloitte, Ernst & Young, Microsoft Canada, Solicitor General, TD Bank, and TD Wealth, among others.

== See also ==
- List of tallest buildings in Winnipeg
