= 300 Main (Winnipeg) =

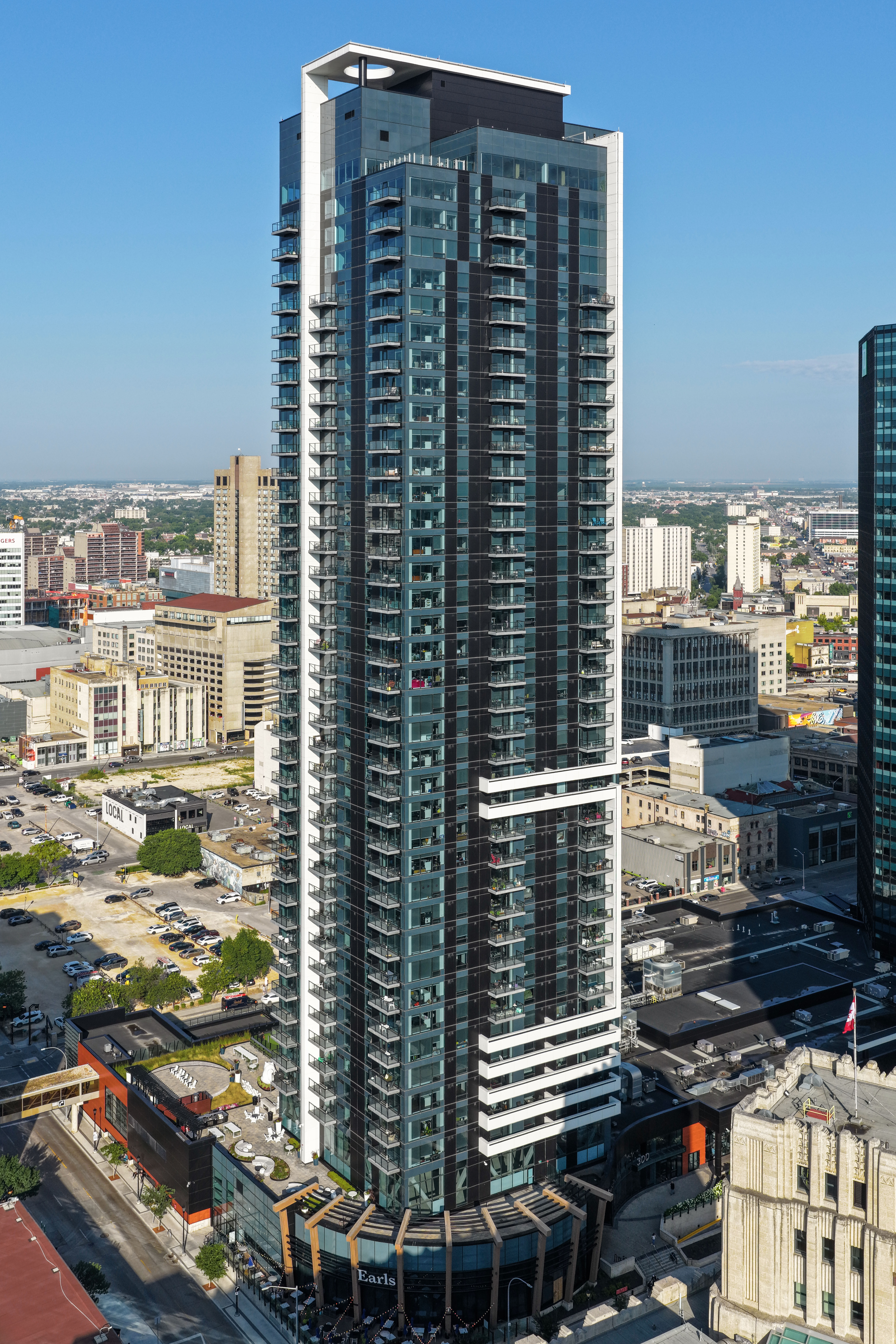
- 300 Main, August 2026
- Interactive map of the 300 Main area

General information
- Status: Completed
- Type: Multifamily residential, retail
- Architectural style: Modern
- Location: 300 Main Street
- Coordinates: 49.8937°N 97.1382°W
- Construction started: 2019
- Completed: 2023
- Cost: $165 m CAD

Height
- Height: 141.7 metres (465 ft)

Technical details
- Floor count: 42
- Floor area: 580,000 ft^{2} (54,000 m^{2})
- Lifts/elevators: 5

Design and construction
- Architecture firm: Ray Wan Architects
- Developer: Artis REIT
- Services engineer: Nova3 Engineering Ltd.

Website
- 300main.ca

300 Main (informally known as the Artis REIT Residential Tower) is a multi-family residential high-rise building on Main Street in Winnipeg, Manitoba, Canada. Standing at 141.7 metres and 42 storeys, it is the tallest building in Winnipeg as well as in Manitoba.

Located near the intersection of Portage and Main in downtown Winnipeg, the building is connected to the Winnipeg Walkway System, as well as other buildings owned by Artis REIT, including 330 Main and the Winnipeg Square parkade. On its first floor is an Earls restaurant, which was previously located two blocks south, closer to The Forks.

This building, together with 330 Main and 360 Main, now spans an entire city block. It is the first residential building to be located at the 300 block near Portage and Main.

In March 2021, it reached the height of 128 metres (420 ft), passing 201 Portage, which had been Winnipeg's tallest tower since 1990.

== See also ==
- 360 Main (Winnipeg)
- List of tallest buildings in Winnipeg
