= Richardson Building (Winnipeg) =

Building in Manitoba, Canada

Coordinates: 49.89607°N 97.1378°W

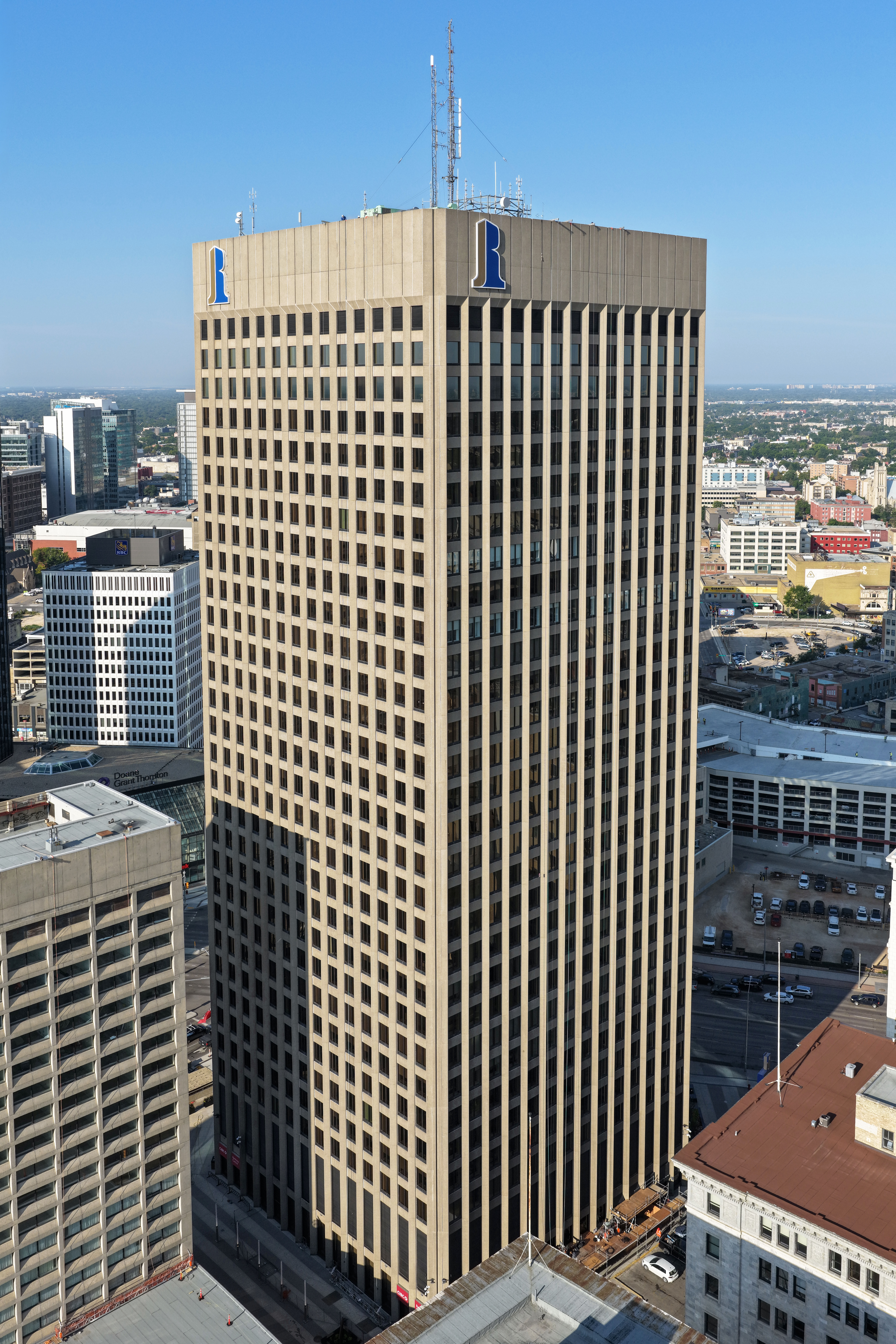
- (August 2026)

General information
- Status: Completed
- Architectural style: international style
- Location: 1 Lombard Place
- Construction started: 1967
- Completed: 1969
- Opened: November 14, 1969
- Owner: Richardson Centre Limited (James Richardson & Sons)

Height
- Height: 407.02 ft

Technical details
- Floor count: 34
- Floor area: 60,600 m^{2} (652,000 sq ft)

Design and construction
- Architects: Smith Carter Searle and Associates; Skidmore, Owings & Merrill (consultants)

The Richardson Building is a 34-storey office tower at the intersection of Portage and Main in Winnipeg, Manitoba, Canada. The building forms the anchor of the Lombard Place development, and is connected to Winnipeg Square shopping mall via the Portage and Main Concourse. The thirty-four storey building stands 124 metres tall (407 ft), making it the (behind 201 Portage and 300 Main) third tallest building in Winnipeg. It is dressed in granite chip pre-cast concrete and solar bronze double-glazed glass.

In 2011, the CBC moved its digital television transmitters for CBWT-DT and CBWFT-DT to the Richardson Building, on a new antenna that raised the pinnacle of the building to 151.8 metres (498 ft), once again making it the tallest structure in Winnipeg.

== Construction ==
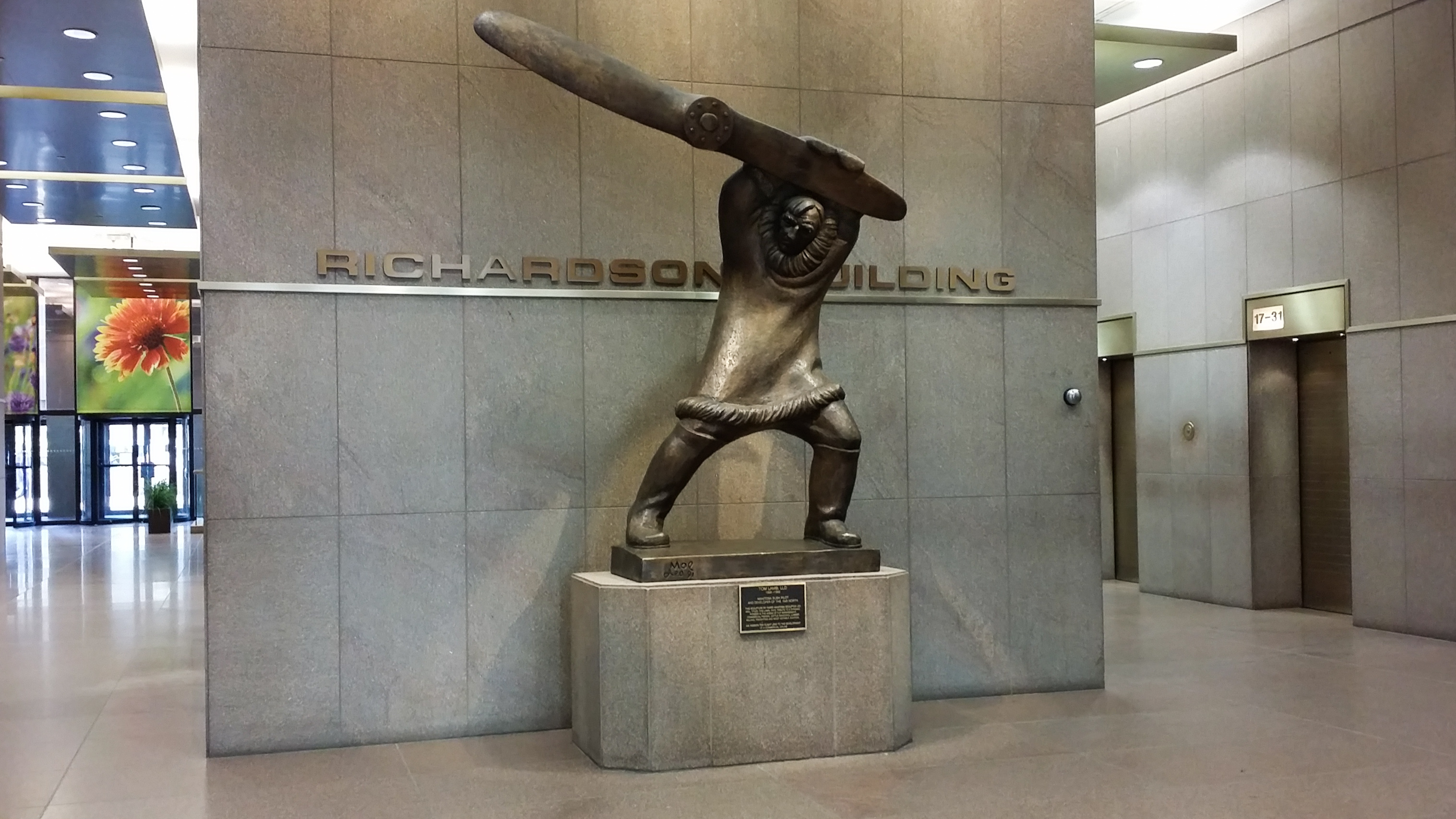
Leo Mol sculpture in the Richardson Building lobby

The current Richardson building is the second attempt at building a headquarters for James Richardson & Sons, Limited at Portage and Main. The original building was planned to stand 17 storeys tall and cost $3 million. Demolition had just begun when the 1929 stockmarket crash hit. Plans for the building were postponed and the lot was unused for nearly forty years.

On 23 February 1967, James Richardson and Sons re-announced that they would build a headquarters at Portage and Main. Designed by Smith Carter Searle and Associates, with Skidmore, Owings and Merrill as consulting architects, it was completed in 1969 and still serves as the headquarters of James Richardson & Sons, Limited. The original cost estimate for the building was $29 million.

Excavation of the site began 19 October 1967. In order to support the skyscraper, the construction involved augering through 50 feet (15 m) of clay above the granite boulders and limestone bedrock underneath the location to install caissons. The construction featured 64 major concrete caissons, some of which contained almost 100 short tons (91 t) of concrete, extending down nearly 85 feet (26 m) below ground. The caissons were drilled through an additional 15 feet (4.6 m) of granite boulder and 10 to 20 feet (3.0 to 6.1 m) of limestone bedrock. The foundation work involved pouring more than 4,800 short tons (4,400 t) of high-strength concrete and 50 short tons (45 t) of steel. The topping-off ceremony was held on 4 November 1968, when the final concrete was poured on the top level.

== Operations ==
As of 1981, the skyscraper held a working population of approximately 3,000. The building had 43,758 light bulbs and approximately 500 sinks and toilets and was managed by 150 operations staff. Operational costs of the building at the time included a monthly electricity bill of as much as $40,000, $110,000/year heating, $20,000/year water, and $1 million/year real estate tax, as well as a $500,000/year cleaning budget, which included 83 cleaning staff. Waste management of the skyscraper featured 6,000 pounds (2,700 kg) daily trash disposal, which was funneled to a compactor in the basement and picked up daily. Exterior management included window cleaning for four days in each April and October. Air conditioners for the building operate from two floors, the 4th and 32nd. Two such machines on the 32nd floor weigh 700 short tons (640 t) and 900 short tons (820 t) each. They are flanked by a pair of 500-horsepower boilers which were fueled by natural gas, but could be transitioned to oil for days of extreme cold. A tank in the basement held 12,000 US gallons (45,000 L) of fuel oil, enough for four days of heat at −34.4 °C (−29.9 °F). In case of emergency, the building had fire hoses on each floor, and a high-powered pump in the basement, as well as a 5,000 US gallons (19,000 L) emergency water supply on the 34th floor and a diesel generator for emergency lighting.

Shortly after opening, the 31st floor was reserved as an Observation Deck where Winnipeggers could view the city and on a clear day see the Selkirk Water Tower. This floor is currently used as offices.

== Public artwork ==
In 2000, a bronze sculpture by Leo Mol was unveiled in the Richardson Plaza alongside the Richardson Building. The sculpture depicts children on an oak tree, and was commissioned by Hartley Richardson. It weighs almost 1,600 kilograms (3,500 lb). At the time it was the largest sculpture Mol had produced.

In 2012, a sculpture by Ivan Eyre was installed as a permanent display outside the Richardson Building. The Winnipeg artist's piece is title North Watch, and depicts a man and his devoted dog.

== Renovation ==
Through 2010 and 2011, the shopping concourse below the building was renovated as part of a larger $10-million project that included work the former Bank of Canada Building at 161 Portage Ave and the Lombard Avenue parkade. The renovation included new granite flooring, new wall and ceiling coverings and a new conference centre. The renovation came approximately two years after a $3-million renovation of Winnipeg Square, an adjoining underground shopping centre.

== See also ==
- List of tallest buildings in Winnipeg
