= Winnipeg Transit =

Public bus agency owned by the City of Winnipeg

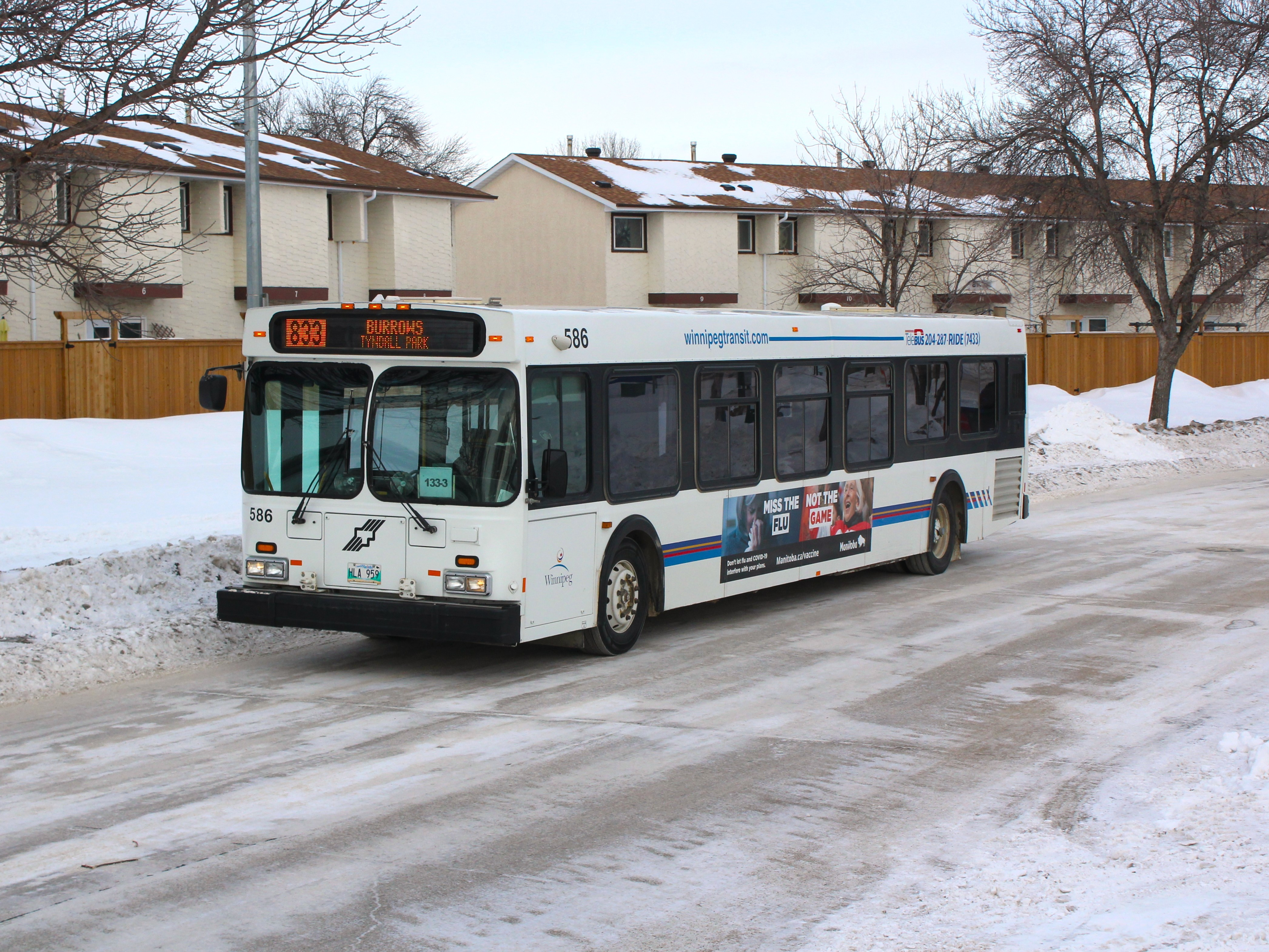
- A Winnipeg Transit Bus
- Founded: Oct. 20, 1882 (143 yrs ago)
- Headquarters: 421 Osborne Street
- Service area: Winnipeg, Manitoba
- Service type: Public Transit
- Routes: 71 routes (2025)
- Stops: 3,872 stops (2025)
- Depots: Fort Rouge Garage; Brandon Garage; North Garage
- Fleet: 640 buses
- Daily ridership: 188,300 (weekdays, Q2 2026)
- Annual ridership: 61,125,000 (2025)
- Fuel type: Diesel
- Operator: City of Winnipeg
- Transit Director: Greg Ewankiw (2020)
- Website: www.winnipegtransit.com

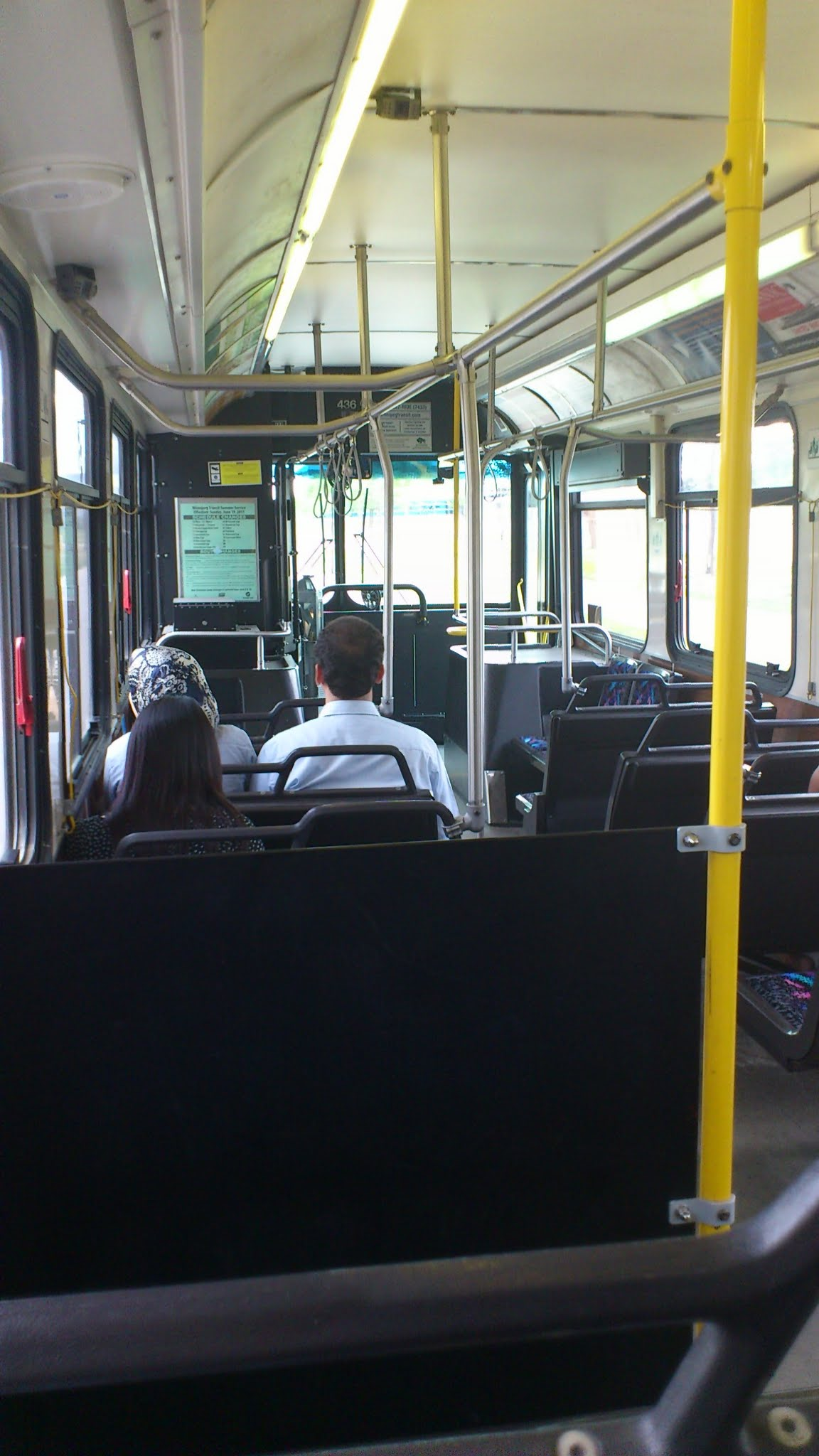
Inside a Winnipeg bus

Winnipeg Transit is the public transit agency, and the bus-service provider, of the City of Winnipeg, Manitoba. Established 143 years ago, it is owned by the city government and currently employs nearly 1,600 people—including approximately 1,100 bus drivers.

Operating 640 low-floor easy-access buses to more than 5,000 bus stops within the city limits, Winnipeg Transit carries almost 170,000 passengers on an average weekday. Moreover, according to the 2016 Census, public transit was the main mode of commuting for 13.6% of the Winnipeg census metropolitan area.

== History (1882–1971) ==
=== 1882–1894: Winnipeg Street Railway Company ===
The first attempt to provide public transportation in Winnipeg would, evidently, be premature. On 19 July 1877, a horse-drawn omnibus operated between the Old Customs Building at Main Street & McDermot and Point Douglas. This was only a single-day attempt and turned out to be a failure.

Four years later, Toronto businessman Albert William Austin recognized the need for public transit in the rapidly growing city of Winnipeg, and incorporated the Winnipeg Street Railway Company (WSR). Soon after, upon prodding the begrudged City Council, Austin was able to establish the WSR on 27 May 1882, under an agreement that required one mile of track to be laid within 6 months.

The first horsecar made a trial run on October 20, 1882, and regular public service began the next day with four cars. The first route ran along Main Street, from City Hall to Fort Garry (Broadway and Main St). The next year, the service was extended to run a track along Portage Avenue, and the first car ran along the new tracks to Kennedy Street on November 11.

Located on Assiniboine Avenue between Main Street and Fort Street, the company's stable had shelter for the horses, though the cars had to stay out on the rails. Fares were CA$0.10 cash per ride—or 15 tickets for $1.00. (In the winter, fares dropped to $0.05 cash.)

The WSR experimented with electric cars in 1891. On January 28 that year, at 7:30 pm, the city's first electric car was tested. Although no official announcement was made, a crowd gathered to watch the car depart from the end of the Main Street Bridge, round the corner of River Avenue, turn onto Osborne Street, loop back near the Jubilee Avenue intersection, and return to the Bridge. The car began regular service on River Avenue (Fort Rouge route) the next morning.

The electric experiment was a clear success. During summer of 1891 the WSR applied for permission to electrify the horsecar railway and run cars over the Main Street Bridge. Winnipeg City Council denied this request, proposing the WSR to rebuild the Bridge which Austin refused.

=== 1892-1904: Winnipeg Electric Street Railway Company ===
Negotiations between WSR and City Council continued over summer until a competing bid by George H. Campbell was proposed to council in September 1891. City Council issued notice it would hear bids for the construction and operation of an electric railway on November 12. Austin, believing the council would consider the numerous previous proposals put forth by the WSR, did not appear to make a bid; thus the City accepted Campbell's proposal as it was the only formal bid made. On 1 February 1892, Austin's competitors and well-known railway contractors, William Mackenzie and James Ross of Montreal, received the exclusive right to operate electric street car service in Winnipeg. That year, on July 26, Mackenzie and Ross ran the city's first electric street car on Main Street, thereby establishing the Winnipeg Electric Street Railway Company (WESR). Passengers on that first trip included Mayor Hugh John Macdonald and the City Council, among others.

The width of Winnipeg's main streets allowed both companies to operate simultaneously.

Hurting WSR even more was a disastrous fire in 1893, in which the Company lost 68 horses. In court, Austin tried to fight for exclusive rights for street railways, going all the way to the Privy Council in London. In 1894, after losing his case, he sold almost all of the company's assets to the WESR for $175,000, and the two companies agreed to amalgamate on April 28.

Horsecar operations ended the next day, except for the Kennedy Street line, which City Council required to operate for another 6 weeks. Austin additionally kept the Elm Park horsecar line to operate as a private venture; his company had opened the Park in the 1890s to drum up business on the line during off-peak times. With the ending of a price war between the two companies, fares doubled, from 50 up to 25 tickets for $1.00, or $0.05 cash.

The WESR continued to expand its lines, its inventory of rolling stock, and its car barns. It bought the Manitoba Electric & Gas Light Company for $400,000 in 1898, and changed line voltage from 250 to the standard 550 volts the following year.

=== 1904–24: Winnipeg Electric Railway Company ===
The Winnipeg General Power Company was incorporated by officers of the Winnipeg Electric Street Railway Company (WESR) in 1902. The two companies amalgamated in 1904, adopting a new name for the combined organization: Winnipeg Electric Railway Company (WER), and now controlled all street railway, electric power, and gas utilities in the city.

Incorporated on 1 March 1902, the Suburban Rapid Transit Company operated west of Winnipeg along Portage Avenue, inaugurating a line as far as Charleswood in 1903, and extending to 'Lot 112 St. Charles' in October 1904. Initially leasing cars and buying power from the WESR, the company was bought up by the amalgamated WER in 1905, which finished expansion of its line to the village of Headingley by the end of the year.

The Winnipeg, Selkirk & Lake Winnipeg Railway, an interurban electric transit company incorporated in 1900, operated cars from the WESR's Main Street terminal to the Town of Selkirk, with a later spur line from West St Paul to Stonewall. In 1906, its stock was bought by the WESR, although it continued to operate as an independent company (to be spun off much later as Beaver Bus Lines).

Also in 1906, a hydroelectric plant was completed in Pinawa, Manitoba, and streetcars started operating on Sundays, following a June 28 plebiscite with 2,891 for and 1,647 against the 'Sunday streetcar' bylaw.

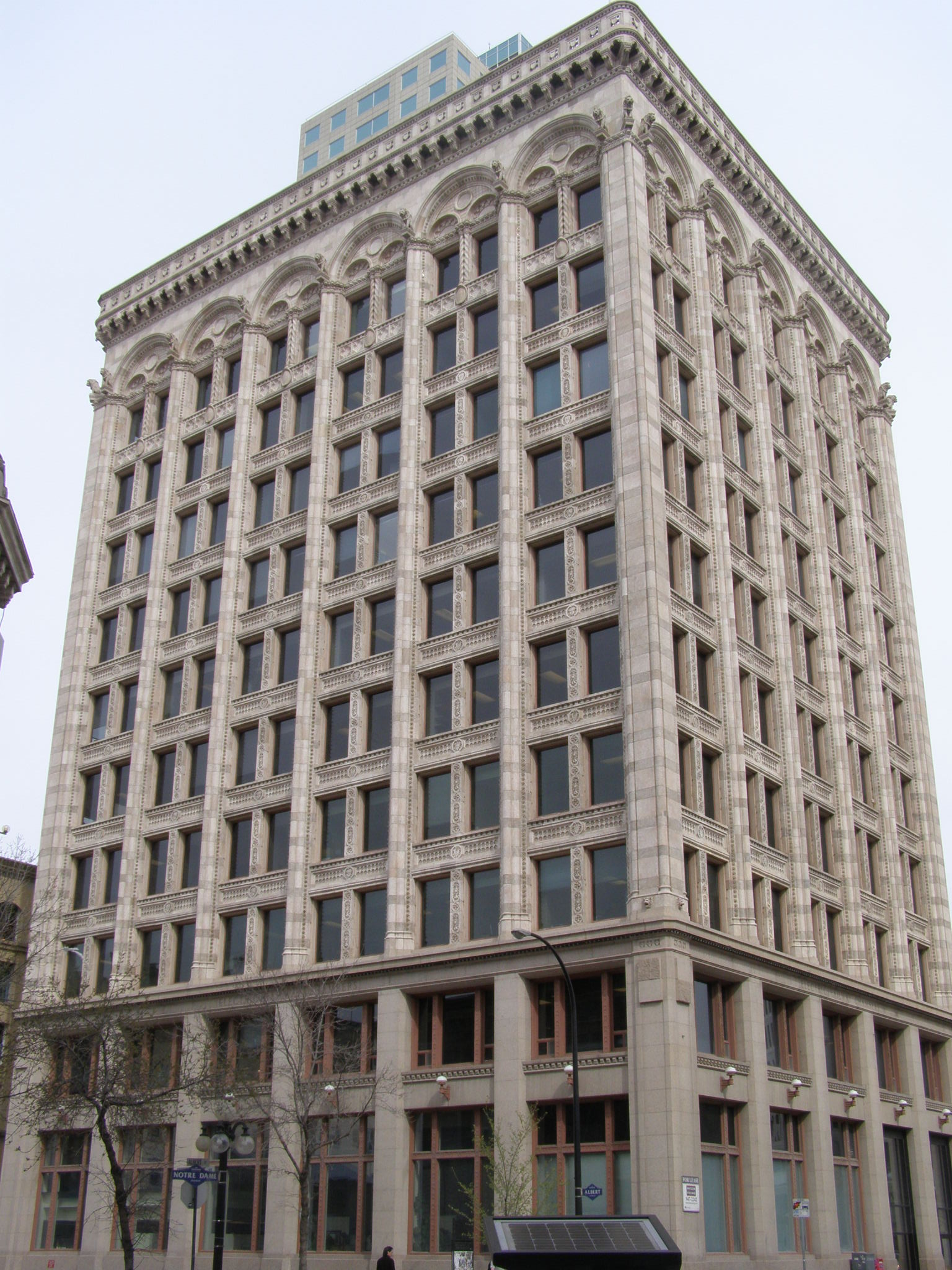
Electric Railway Chambers, Winnipeg

The Company did well during the economic boom of the early 1900s, and built a new headquarters in the eleven-storey Electric Railway Chambers building at Notre Dame Avenue and Albert Street in 1911–1913. The Company occupied the basement and the first two floors and leased out the remaining space to other tenants.

In 1914, the Public Utilities Commission ordered the WER to start collecting fares on a pay-as-you-enter (PAYE) system, which required some rebuilding of cars. PAYE was implemented beginning on 27 May 1914. From 1914 to 1915, the WER would start to experience competition from jitneys, privately owned taxi cabs. The financial pressures of this competition, tensions with the Public Utilities Commission about route planning, complaints regarding the poor state of rolling stock all led to a crisis in 1918. Negotiations with the city led to a repealing of the jitney bylaw, some route changes, a program of rebuilding old trolley cars, and the first appearance of motor buses in Winnipeg.

On 1 May 1918, Winnipeg saw its first gasoline-powered bus in operation.

The company was also affected by the Winnipeg General Strike of 1919. On June 21, or "Bloody Saturday," strikers set on-fire Streetcar 596, which was run by non-union WER staff members.

A terrible explosion and fire at the Main Street car barn on April 7, 1920, after which some replacement rolling stock was bought from the Twin City Rapid Transit Company of Minneapolis (most of the WER's stock had been built by the company in Winnipeg, or by the Ottawa Car Company).

The Winnipeg Electric Railway Co. took out a full-page ad in September 1920, titled "That The Public May Know The Facts", to state the company's side of being forced by the Public Utilities Commission and the City of Winnipeg to remove their tracks in the north city-limits area.

In 1921 it also bought some Birney Safety Cars from Preston Car & Coach, which would start service in 1923 after delays caused by controversy over the safety of the one-man cars. Increasing competition with the automobile and the post-war economic slump led to the company rebuilding the rest of its own fleet as one-man cars.

=== 1924–53: Winnipeg Electric Company ===
On March 13, 1924, the Manitoba Legislature passed a Bill changing the company's name to the Winnipeg Electric Company (WECo), enlarging the company's power, and increasing its number of board members from 9 to 12. The new title came into effect on April 5, 1924, followed an industry trend of removing the word "railroad" to emphasize other profitable aspects of a company in the face of declining rail traffic and reduced returns on investments.

On 21 November 1938, WECo started the first modern trolleybus service in Western Canada, on Winnipeg's Sargent Avenue, using 6 vehicles on a 4.0-kilometre (2.5 mi) route. The trolleybus fleet and system were expanded during and after World War II, reaching a peak of 162 vehicles and 70 route miles (110 kilometres) from 1956 to 1959.

Between 1939 and 1945, as many male transit employees had volunteered to fight in the Second World War, WECo trained and hired female streetcar operators and mechanics. At the peak, there were 53 women employed as drivers and maintenance workers for public transit. They worked under the same union agreement, conditions, and wages as their male counterparts.

In January 1940, William Carter was named the new President of WECo.

During the summer of 1948, a Public Utility Board inquiry took place questioning the depreciation costs claimed by WECo. and its predecessors on streetcar equipment. This led to a difference of $495,000, part of which WECo. overclaimed $363,504, overestimated $30,000 for snow removal costs, and didn't include a $99,000 "saving" on conversion to trolleybuses.

The River Avenue bus route was extended and its name changed to Crescent in October 1949 after a six-month battle over the routing.

=== 1953–60: Greater Winnipeg Transit Commission ===
A referendum was conducted on 25 March 1953, where only the electorate in the city proper were eligible to vote. It turned out that the privately owned Winnipeg Electric Company (WECo) did not want to operate the transit system any longer. An editorial in the Winnipeg Tribune said:

In the Referendum on Wednesday, Winnipeg electors stated emphatically that they want the mass transit facilities of the metropolitan area owned and operated by the people of Greater Winnipeg.

As result, within a month of the referendum, the multi-municipality Greater Winnipeg Transit Commission (GWTC) was created through legislation passed by the Manitoba Legislature—the Greater Winnipeg Transit Commission Act, which was proclaimed into law, effective 1 May 1953. As result, on May 29, the Manitoba Government took over operation of the Winnipeg Electric Company, thereby beginning the service of publicly owned transit in Winnipeg. The purchase of WECo assets were officially completed on November 11 later that year. A 5% gross-revenue tax was replaced by a seat-mile tax in the amount of "one thirtieth cent per mile" (1/30¢ per mile (1/30¢ per 1.6 kilometre)).

Just as in other jurisdictions, there was proof that the oil industry conspired to get rid of the electric streetcars because it prevented more people from purchasing automobiles. Traffic engineers wanted access to the Canadian Pacific Railway (CPR) subway (at Higgins and Main) to allow for regular vehicular traffic as, up until September 19, two lanes were exclusively used for streetcar traffic. Soon enough, streetcars in Winnipeg saw their last day of operation on 18 September 1955. These last Street Cars were paraded on Main Street with the lead car painted with a crying face and the phrase "We've had it!" above the windows.

After dismantling the streetcar network, the GWTC created a mascot, Transit Tom, who made his advertisement debut in 1955, with the slogan “Take A Bus!”.

Limited stop bus service was introduced on the Portage route starting 4 November 1957. A five-cent premium fare was charged to passengers. By May 1960, GWTC had tweaked the Portage Express and added the Ness Express routes. Mylar signs using white text on a red background indicated to passengers the bus was Express rather than a local bus.

=== 1961–69: Metro Winnipeg Transit ===
On 1 January 1961, the Greater Winnipeg Transit Commission was reorganized as the Transit Department of the newly established Metropolitan Corporation of Greater Winnipeg—dubbed Metro Winnipeg Transit (or Metro Transit)—and was managed by D. I. MacDonald. On the eve of this takeover, the GWTC suggested consideration of a rapid transit subway for Winnipeg, but agreed it would be premature to plan for immediate construction. Inspired by the Seattle world's fair, MacDonald would later suggest the construction of a monorail system to run along Portage Ave. and Main Street, instead of a subway system. However the plan would not materialize, despite strong support from mayor Steven Juba, due to opposition from city council.

In 1962, as part of the new Metro administration, a metropolitan development plan began after taking several years to complete. The transportation component, referred to as the Winnipeg Area Transportation Study, whose recommendations were published in January 1969, called for five freeways, a suburban beltway, and a 8.7-kilometre (5.4-mile) underground subway. A report on transit was released in October that year, recommending to scrap the idea of a "downtown bus terminal" for Winnipeg Transit. It also recommended a price reduction of 50 cents for monthly passes.

On 1 January 1963, Metro Transit offered to purchase a fleet of 11 diesel buses for C$200,000 from White Ribbon Bus Lines, which served the City of Transcona. Also in early 1963, Metro Winnipeg Transit began to get rid of the Zone Fare system in some areas. Councillor Bernie Wolfe led a campaign against Zone Fares, saying that this extra fare encouraged carpooling in the Fort Garry area. Abolishing the Zone Fare would result in a loss of $130,000 annual revenue to the Transit Department.

Metro Winnipeg Transit phased out the trolleybus fleet throughout the 1960s. At one point, Winnipeg City Council begged Metro to stop this phase out, but it continued nonetheless. In 1965, electric coaches began to be replaced by diesel buses. When service was expanded into new areas, overhead lines were taken down, after which diesel buses ran those lines. In April 1969, bus fares were raised from 15 cents to 25 cents. Also that year, the main transit garage was moved from Assiniboine Avenue to a new location on south Osborne Street.

== Recent history (1970–present) ==
=== 1970–73 ===
The last trolleybus in Winnipeg ran on 30 October 1970; the vehicle used is preserved.

As early as 1971, Dial-A-Bus was studied as a way to transport passengers from very low-density suburban neighbourhoods.

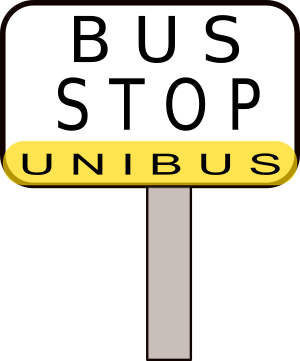

In August 1970, several River Heights residents opposed a jointly managed Unibus shuttle service for students of the University of Manitoba. Riding Unibus would save students from paying the regular adult fare, instead having them pay $20 for six months' use. In December, however, a legal case was opened at the Manitoba Court of Queens Bench, filed by a Lindsay Street (River Heights) resident claiming that Metro Transit, under the 1960 Metropolitan Winnipeg Act, had no authority to operate the Unibus service. Residents were upset that the routes would depreciate housing where the buses traversed and that the service was only available to University students. In September 1971, 60 residents showed up to the last Metro Council meeting to protest the running of the Unibus service in the Riverview area, complaining of bus traffic on Balfour, Maplewood, and Casey streets.

Two weeks later, the City's civic election took place, replacing Metro Winnipeg with a Unicity government. Upon this municipal merger, public transit services became the responsibility of the newly unified City of Winnipeg on January 1, 1972, with Metro Transit becoming the City of Winnipeg Transit Department, or Winnipeg Transit.

At the behest of Metro, a summer-only shuttle service to Birds Hill Provincial Park, outside the city, was instituted on 21 May 1971, charging 75 cents for adults and 50 cents for seniors. However, Winnipeg Transit would go on to say that they were not making enough on the fares to pay for the shuttle, and ended the service on 3 September 1979.

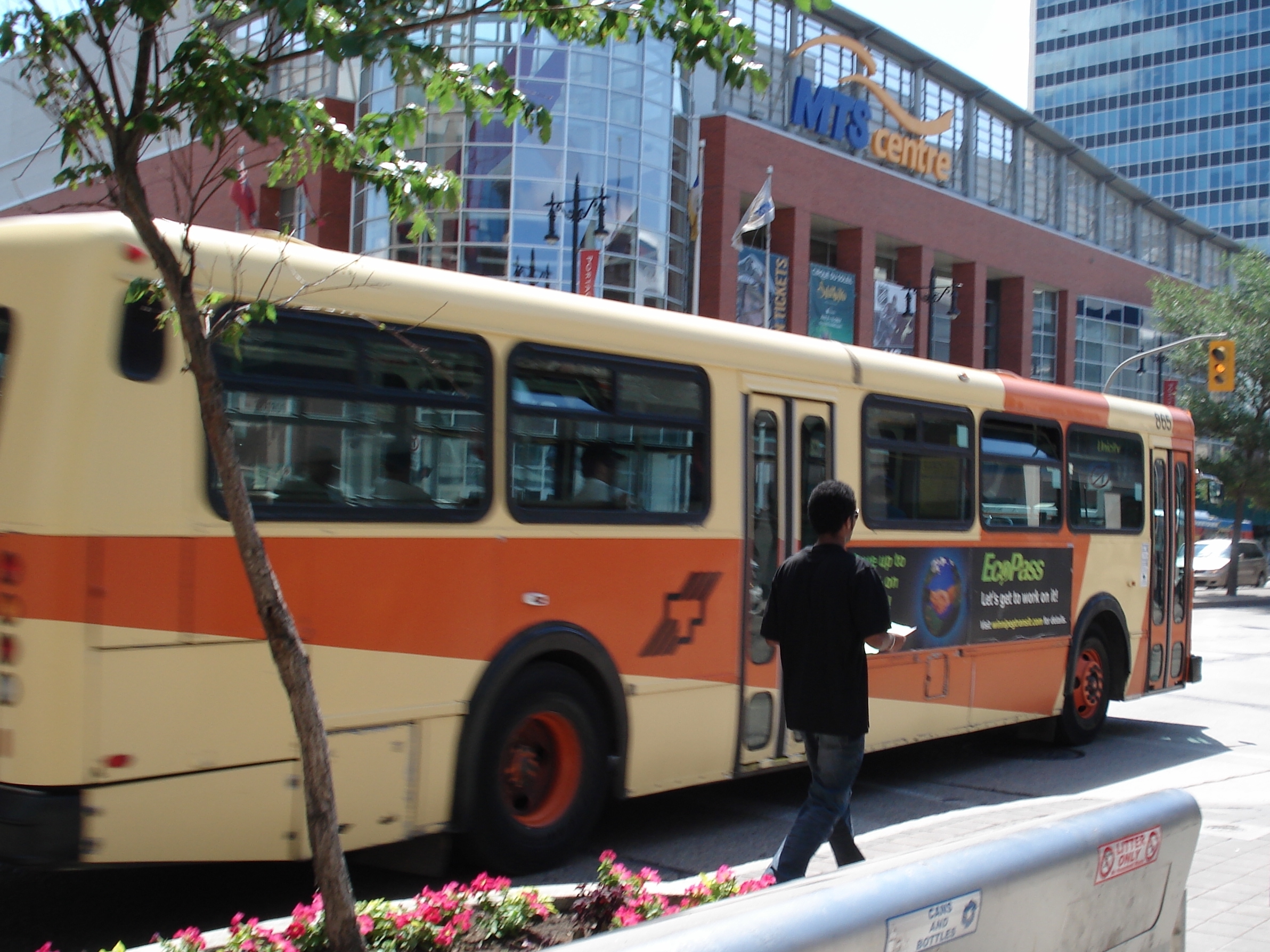
A Winnipeg bus still in the older transit orange-and-cream paint scheme

=== 1974–79 ===
Express bus service between downtown Winnipeg and King's Park commenced 17 February 1974, replacing the local bus service to that community.

In February 1975, the city began DASH (Downtown Area SHuttle; now Downtown Spirit), a free shuttle service operating on 5-minute headways, Mondays to Fridays between 9am and 4pm, throughout the Central Business District of downtown Winnipeg.

In early 1976, the union for Winnipeg Transit, Amalgamated Transit Union (ATU) 1505, had not signed a new contract. Workers went off the job starting 26 January 1976. Both the Mayor of Winnipeg and Premier of Manitoba were powerless in stopping the transit strike, which strike lasted for 47 days and ended after ratification by the ATU on March 12. Council voted 41-1 (out of a nominal 50 members) the day prior to agree to the new 17-month contract. Councillor Florence Pierce (ICEC - Glenlawn) was the only Councillor present who voted against the new contract. The effects of the strike left many people stranded or unable to travel to work or for medical appointments. The issues were mainly wage and work scheduling-related. The Board of Commissioners had stated that if the ATU wins a pay increase, certain routes may be cancelled and a 10 cent far implemented on the DASH route and Dial-A-Bus service to Saint Norbert & Fort Richmond cancelled. According to D. I. MacDonald:

It may be necessary to review the level of transit service provided, due to the rapid escalation of transit costs, to the point where the transit deficit is now a major budget item.

In 1977, Winnipeg Handi-Transit began as a 2-year test project to provide parallel public transit service to those with limited physical mobility. Two years later, Handi-Transit was made a permanent feature of Winnipeg Transit's operations.

Also in the late 1970s, Winnipeg Transit paid an outside design firm to create a new logo for the transit department, although it would not be until two or three years later when bus stops begun to feature the new design.

=== 1980s–90s ===
Winnipeg Transit installed a modern two-way radio system, capable of addressing a specific bus in 1982. The project received $2.5 million from the City and $90,000 from the federal government.

In 1982, Winnipeg Transit refurbished 8 GM New Look buses that were originally built in the early 1960s rather than purchasing brand new buses. From 1984 onwards and for the next six years, Winnipeg Transit would refurbish 10 buses annually. When Edmonton and Calgary completed the first phase of their light rail (LRT) systems in the early 1980s, they found that they needed fewer diesel buses. They sold some of them to Winnipeg Transit, which in turn bought 10 double-rear-door Flyer models from Edmonton (380 series) at a cost of $20,000 each, and another nine GM New Look buses from Calgary (290 series) at a cost of $35,000 each. The Edmonton buses had red seats and featured double rear doors. The Edmonton buses were sold off by 1985.

In April 1982 the Works and Operations Committee awarded Mediacom, Inc. a contract to build and maintain 200 transit shelters with advertising for a period of 15 years.

During the week of 23 September 1982, Winnipeg Transit tested a GM-built articulated bus on the Portage and Pembina routes. The bus, numbered 900, was constructed from parts of a GM New Look with a Classic front end. It was destined to operate as part of the Mississauga Transit fleet.

Winnipeg Transit purchased 20 electronic fareboxes from GFI in 1985 at the cost of C$7,000 each to eliminate theft of dollar bills by bus operators. However, the boxes were incompatible with the one dollar loonie coin introduced in 1987 and were then removed from service.

During the summer of 1985 all bus stops in Winnipeg were replaced with new ones bearing a telephone number that started with 235-. When a transit passenger called this number he/she would hear a computerized female voice give the current time, and the transit routes and times those routes passed through that particular stop. Telebus, which is based on software by Teleride Corporation, was officially launched in February 1986. Costs were shared 50-50 between the Province and City to pay the $1.3 million to set up the original system. However, in 1987 all bus stop decals were replaced with the 287- telephone exchange.

After Calgary Transit's C-Train LRT expanded into the Northeast in April 1985, 30 brand new Flyer buses (600–630 series) were sold to Winnipeg and put into service in 1986. Calgary Transit had offered to sell 30 "slightly used" GM New Look buses to Winnipeg Transit, but the Province pressured the city to purchase the Flyer buses to support the provincially owned Flyer Industries as a local manufacturer. Building new buses cost the City $5.4 million, $1.5 million more than it would have cost to purchase the "slightly used" Calgary vehicles.

On 31 December 1992, transit services to Headingley were withdrawn.

After several years delay, the Graham Avenue Transit Mall was completed over a two-year period (1994–95) at a cost of $5.7 million.

Winnipeg Transit bought its first low-floor accessible bus in 1994. Also that year, the Winnipeg Free Press conducted a downtown idea contest, which Jeff Lowe won with an idea for a rail-based streetcar to serve the downtown Winnipeg area. Subsequently, this idea was added to the CentrePlan report; the CentrePlan formed a "downtown connector" committee, of which a representative from Winnipeg Transit participated.

Since June 1995, Winnipeg Transit allowed non-directional transfers, which were initially set for a 90-minute period. When the electronic fareboxes were introduced in 2013, the transfer time was reduced to 75 minutes, making it somewhat difficult to accomplish errands that are further away or take up more time. Beginning in September 1995, Winnipeg Transit designated Main Street, between Higgins Avenue and Graham, as a bus-only lane during peak hours (7-9 am, 15h30-17h30 weekdays).

The Pan American Games were hosted by Winnipeg in the summer of 1999, and in order to provide transportation to athletes, volunteers, media, and spectators, Winnipeg Transit increased its fleet to 665 buses.

Also in 1999, the Downtown BIZ had put forward a request for a feasibility study on a streetcar connector for downtown; however, this did not happen until 2002. The subsequent report, which was never released, was very soft on recommending any form of connector service.

=== 2000–10 ===
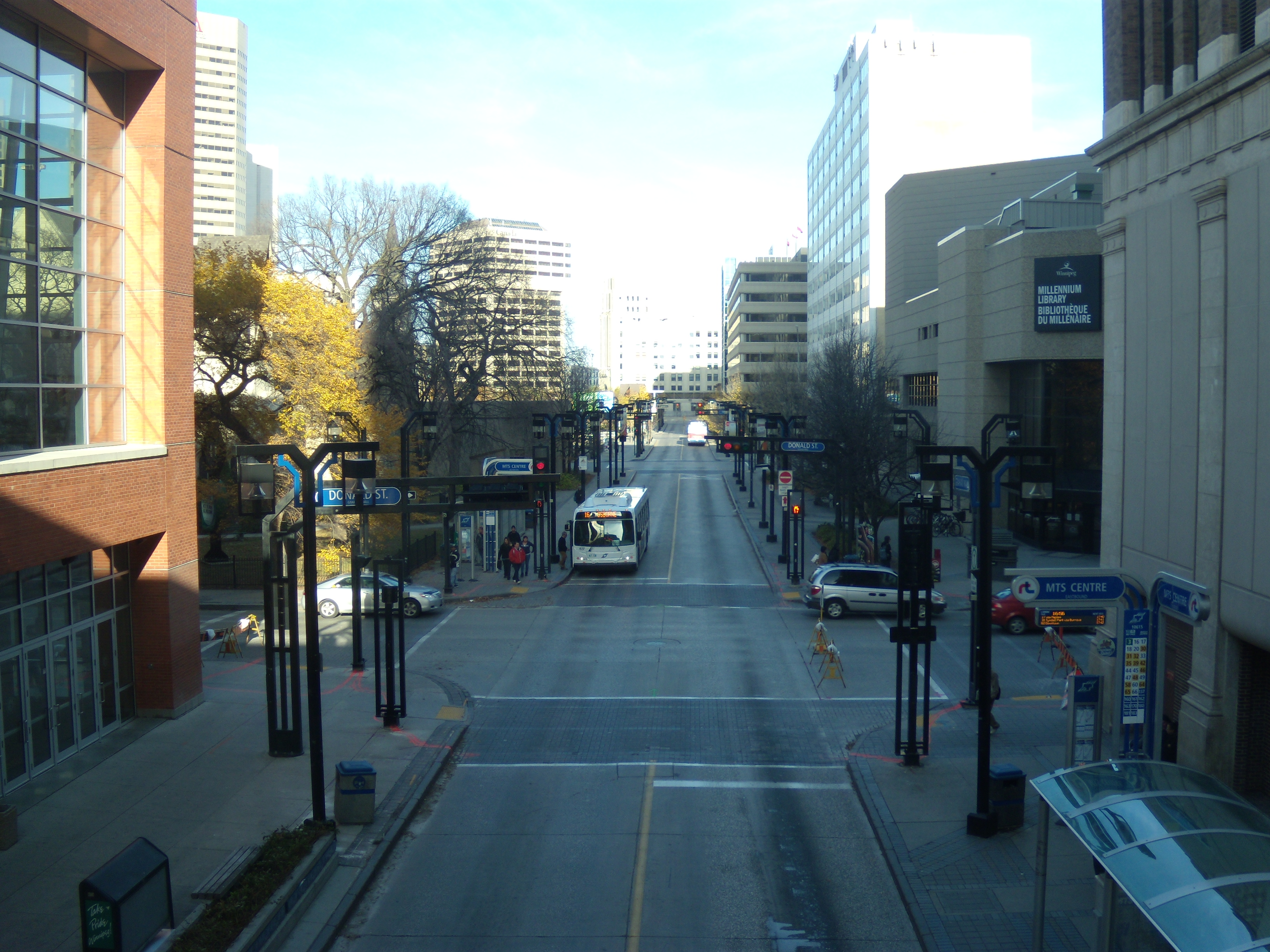
Graham Avenue Transit Mall, 2012

In September 2000, a new transit route concept was introduced, the SuperExpress. The idea behind the SuperExpress is to shuttle passengers who live in the outer suburbs (closer to the Perimeter Hwy.) faster than the normal Express routes. This was based on how the NYC MTA Bus system is organized. Originally introduced as the 61 University SuperExpress, it has since been extended to other routes, such as 25 Ness SuperExpress, 36 NorthWest SuperExpress.

In the early 21st century, the three levels of government made a deal to fund the development of three infrastructure projects:

1. the Kenaston Underpass, which was completed in the fall of 2006;
2. funding for expansion of the Floodway, which was completed in 2010; and
3. Phase I of the Southwest Transit Corridor, which was completed in 2019

In early 2007, it was announced that, if more than 24 centimetres (9.4 in) of snow were to fall, only 7 mainline transit routes would operate. Since then, Winnipeg Transit has devised a more detailed winter snow plan, with three phases:

- In the first phase (the "Blue Snow Plan"), most suburban and short-trip routes (including DART service) would not operate, and most other routes would operate on shortened or simplified routes.
- In the second phase (the "Red Snow Plan"), transit service would be reduced to 13 routes running along major arterial roads and serving downtown, major hospitals, and the airport.
- In the third phase, transit would cease to operate completely.

As of September 2009, Winnipeg Transit has not had to implement the snow plan.

On November 16, 2007, the federal, provincial, and municipal governments announced the Transit Improvement Program, which included upgrades and improvements to existing infrastructure for buses, such as transit priority signals, transit-only lanes, and new bus shelters. In addition to an order of 33 new regular 12-metre (40 ft) low-floor buses, Winnipeg Transit also ordered twenty new 18-metre (60 ft) articulated Diesel-Electric Hybrid buses; the first bus was delivered by the end of 2007. The test of the first articulated bus was not successful, and that part of the order was cancelled.

In 2008, Winnipeg Transit added the "next stop" program, wherein the upcoming bus stop on a route is announced by a computerized female voice, as well as the street name being shown on a small display on the ceiling at the front of the bus. The display would also show whether a stop has been requested by a passenger. The program was preceded by a phase where transit operators called out stops, which led to debate over whether this would distract drivers from the road.

As of 2009, Telebus operates through only telephone number corresponding to BUS-RIDE phrase. Users can access information about buses stopping at a specific bus stop by entering the five-digit code located on the sign for that stop. The first number of the stop designates the municipal area the stop is located in (1 for the old City of Winnipeg, 5 for St. Boniface and St. Vital, etc.).

In 2010, installation of bicycle racks on buses was revived. (This was preceded by earlier trials on Route 18 in 1999, and on Route 60 from 2000 to 2004 or 2006.) Thirty buses that are used on Routes 160, 162, and 170 now have two-place bike racks installed during summer months, between May 1 and October 31. However, as of 2017, some transit users have been frustrated that the program is not dependable. Beginning in spring 2018, buses with bike racks were made identifiable on Navigo, Winnipeg Transit's online scheduling system.

On 8 April 2012, Winnipeg officially opened the Southwest Transitway, as well as introducing Rapid Transit (RT) to the city.

In 2012, Winnipeg Transit purchased twenty 2003/2004-era New Flyer buses (sized 60 feet or 18.29 metres) from OC Transpo for $53,000 each. After refurbishment between 2012 and 2014, Winnipeg Transit began operating some of these buses, starting with the 54 St. Mary's and 59 South St. Anne's express routes on 13 January 2014.

In July 2016, Winnipeg Transit introduced the Peggo electronic fare payment system, designed to replace paper tickets and passes. This new reloadable electronic fare card featured an embedded microchip that communicates with the on-board farebox.

In a report released in June 2019 it was estimated to cost Winnipeg Transit $2.4 million annually to extend the free fare for children aged birth to 11 (currently age 5).

=== 2019 ===
A June 2019 Leger survey commissioned by the Canadian Urban Transit Association found that in Winnipeg alone, one in three survey respondents "think public transit is poorly developed in their area" and that more than half found "transit infrastructure in their community is outdated."

Since late October 2019, Winnipeg Transit Inspectors have worn protective vests, to protect themselves if there are confrontations with passengers or others nearby.

==== Contract negotiations ====
From January 2019 to the fall of that year, Amalgamated Transit Union (ATU) workers at Winnipeg Transit were without a contract. During the spring and summer there were two days of "free" transit where bus operators did not enforce fares. There were four votes on contracts, all of them voted down. The ATU said that while they did not want to go on strike (as in 1976), they might be forced to do so. Issues this time centered around safety issues since the murder of Irvine Fraser on 14 February 2017.

In mid-September, University of Manitoba Students' Union expressed their support for the transit union's issues, but feared that a major transit strike would cause undue hardship on students as the University of Manitoba is Winnipeg Transit's second most important trip attractor, besides downtown Winnipeg.

A new 48-month contract was voted on, with 52% in favour of accepting the current offer. It was subsequently approved by EPC on October 17, and passed by Council one week later on October 24. The new contract increased wages 1.25% (2020), 2% (2021), 1.75% (2022), and 2% (2023).

==== Transit Master Plan ====
In May 2017, transit planner Jarrett Walker was invited by advocacy group Functional Transit Winnipeg to speak in Winnipeg on the topic of a Frequent Transit Network. Jarrett travels to various cities to promote frequent transit as a priority over coverage.

Recently, Winnipeg Transit received funding to redesign its transit system for the next quarter century. Called the Transit Master Plan (TMP), public consultations took place in March and April 2019, with "Draft Route Plans" released in October 2019.

The TMP came about because many passengers feel that many WT routes do not go where people need to go (work, school, shopping). Other issues involve:

- Buses that do not operate frequently enough when people need the service such as late at night or on weekends.
- Passengers experience buses that are early, late, do not show up at all (phantom buses).
- Overcrowding is a problem on several routes. To help alleviate this issue, WT ordered 28 New Flyer 60 ft (18.29 m) buses, with delivery in 2019. These buses will be used on the BLUE BRT route, which begun in April 2020.
- Peggo, the electronic fare card system introduced in 2016, has been plagued by software glitches.
- Adult fares ($3.00 cash, $102.05 monthly) are considered high for those who are underemployed or unemployed. A Low Income Fare & Pass policy is currently being considered for implementation for the Spring of 2020.
- Winnipeg Transit does not serve communities beyond the Perimeter Hwy (with the exception of St. Norbert). These include Headingley, Oakbank, East St. Paul, and Niverville. The Transit Master Plan will examine how to serve these and other communities in the Winnipeg Metro Region.

The TMP process is designed to address the above issues.

Part of the Transit Master Plan may address the issue of serving communities beyond the Perimeter Highway. In March 2019 the RM of Rosser urged Winnipeg Transit to extend its service between the RM and the growing CentrePort employment area. Since then a wider study that is part of an updated Transportation Master Plan will examine ways extending service to exurban communities and introduce Park & Ride facilities on major thoroughfares near the Perimeter Hwy.

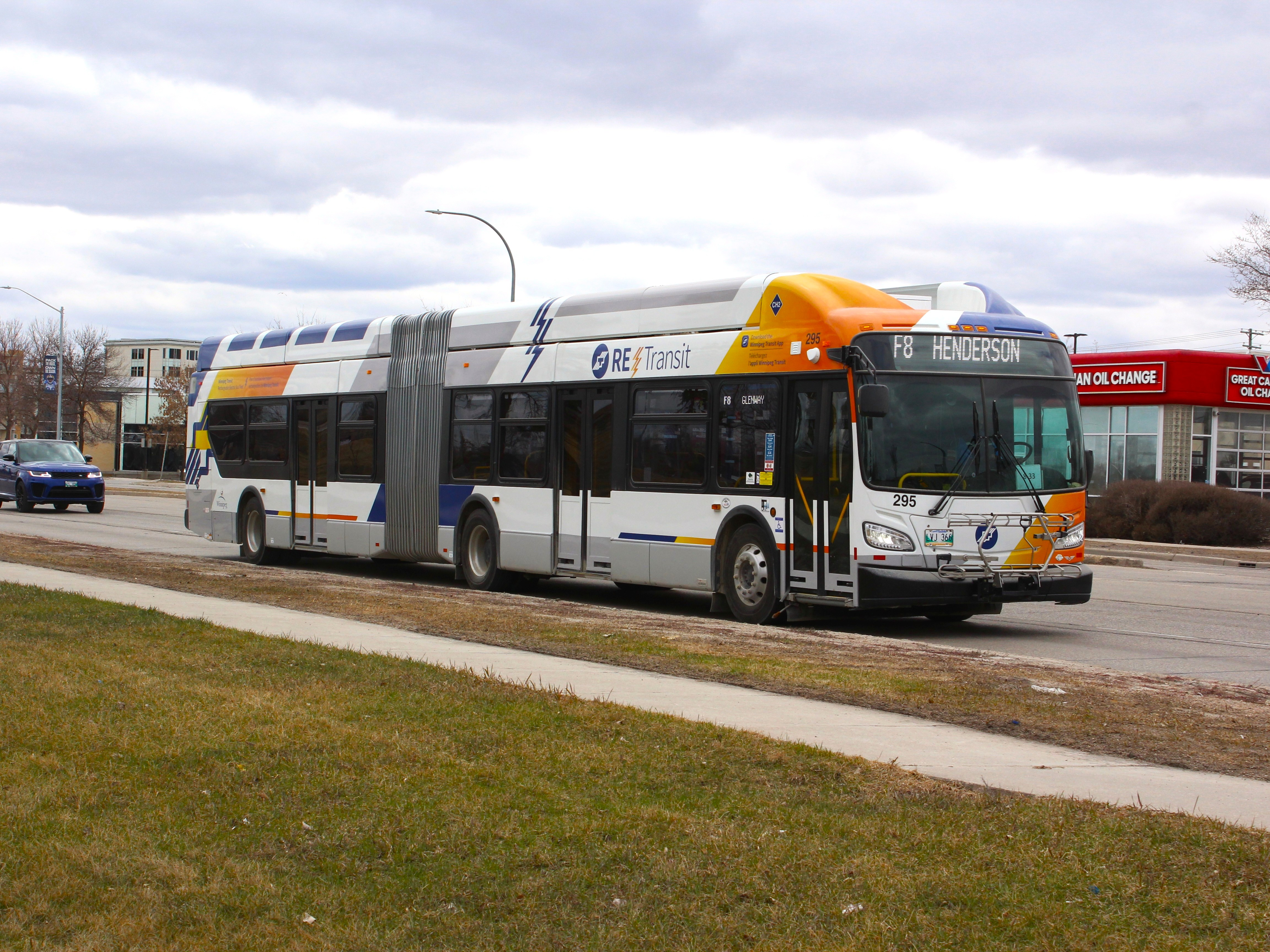
Winnipeg Transit bus #295, the first 60-foot hydrogen fuel cell bus in Canada, operating route F8

A "Public Engagement Report" was published in July summarizing feedback from March and April 2019. On October 25, 2019, the Phase II Draft report of the Transit Master Plan was released. It shows a total redesign of transit routes, many of them operating in a straight line, some no longer operating within the downtown Winnipeg area, some others on other roads. For example, routes 'A' (SW Transitway-Portage), 'B' (Main-St. Mary's), and 'C' (Grant-Regent) are designated rapid transit. The 55 St. Anne's would no longer travel west beyond the Univ. of Winnipeg, and would not travel south on Main St. and St. Mary's Rd. which already duplicates the 14 St. Mary's route. Instead a route 'G' (St. Anne's-Univ. of Winnipeg) would continue eastward over the Provencher Bridge to Rue Des Meurons and head south till it meets with St. Anne's Rd.

Funding for the $2.6 million Transit Master Plan comes from the federally administered Public Transit Infrastructure Fund.

=== 2021 ===
Winnipeg City Council adopted the final TMP on April 29.

=== 2023 ===
In November Winnipeg's Public Works Committee approved a proposal to accelerate implementation of the TMP's primary route network to June 2025, instead of 2026 as previously scheduled.

=== 2024 ===
In 2024, Winnipeg Transit released updated system maps for the upcoming Primary Transit Network. In addition to various route changes, the way Primary Network routes were identified was changed. Instead of using a singular letter (A, B, C, etc.), they would instead use an acronym of the route class (FX, F, D), followed by a number. The only exception was route A, which changed to BLUE, same as the already-existing route. The Feeder Network routes continued to use 2 or 3-digit numbers.

=== 2025 ===
Winnipeg Transit started to introduce zero-emission buses (ZEB) in service. Winnipeg became the first Canadian city to operate a 60-foot battery-electric bus in August and a 60-foot hydrogen fuel cell bus in December. Winnipeg Transit also began operation of 40-foot battery-electric buses in September and 40-foot hydrogen fuel cell buses in December.

On June 29, the Transit Master Plan's Primary Transit Network came into effect, which saw most pre existing routes in the city discontinued or modified. The new network also saw the decommissioning of the Graham Avenue Transit Mall, with all but two stops removed after the new network launched.

== Services and programs ==
From 1975 to 2020, the city was operating the Downtown Spirit (formerly Downtown Area SHuttle, or DASH), a free shuttle service operating weekdays throughout the Central Business District of downtown Winnipeg.

Winnipeg Handi-Transit, introduced as a permanent service of Winnipeg Transit in 1979, provides parallel public transit service to those with limited physical mobility.

=== Rapid Transit ===
Bus in downtown Winnipeg near the historic Marlborough Hotel

In response to an expressway plan published in 1957 that was sponsored by the Downtown Winnipeg Association, a city councillor sponsored the hiring of Norman D. Wilson to design a subway plan for the greater Winnipeg area. This plan was published on 11 April 1959 as the Future Development of the Greater Winnipeg Transit System.

In the late 1960s, as part of the Greater Winnipeg Development Plan, the Winnipeg Area Transportation Study (WATS) recommended a 8.7-kilometre (5.4 mi) underground subway line between Queen St. in St. James to Hespeler Avenue in Elmwood.

Winnipeg Transit's official policy since 1973 has been to promote Bus Rapid Transit as the mode of choice for the Southwest Transit Corridor.

By the mid-2000s, Mayor Sam Katz had wanted to move the rapid transit situation forward. He commissioned several studies: Rapid Transit Task Force (2005), Transportation Authority Study (2009), LRT Conversion Study (2009–10), Winnipeg Transportation Strategy (2010).

On April 8, 2012, service on Phase one of Winnipeg's bus rapid transit line; the Southwest Transitway began. All RT routes terminate at Balmoral Station in Downtown Winnipeg (Except Route 185), next to the University of Winnipeg. RT routes then run along the Graham Avenue Transit Mall to Main Street, then south down Queen Elizabeth Way to Stradbrook Avenue where buses enter the 3.6 kilometres (2.2 mi) Southwest Transitway and travel southwest.

There are four stations on the Southwest Transitway; Harkness Station, Osborne Station, Fort Rouge Station, and Jubilee Station.

Buses enter/exit the Southwest Transitway either just past Osborne Station or the Jubilee Overpass and continue to their final destinations in South Winnipeg, the University of Manitoba or Investors Group Field. The Cost of Phase one was 138 million dollars.

Phase Two will see the Southwest Transitway extended south from the Jubilee Overpass to Bison Drive just west of the University of Manitoba. The cost for the second phase is around 408 million dollars.

Winnipeg Transit also is looking at other corridors for the city including the East Corridor to Transcona, as well as a proposed West Corridor, along Portage Avenue to Polo Park, with a spur line to the airport.

During the Summer of 2018, road inspections deemed it necessary to repave parts of the SWBRT, a mere six years after the opening of Phase I. The repaving project cost $700,000.

Phase 2 of the Southwest Transitway was opened on April 8, 2020.

In June, 2025, Winnipeg's bus rapid transit line was extended alongside the implementation of the primary route network.

=== Routes ===
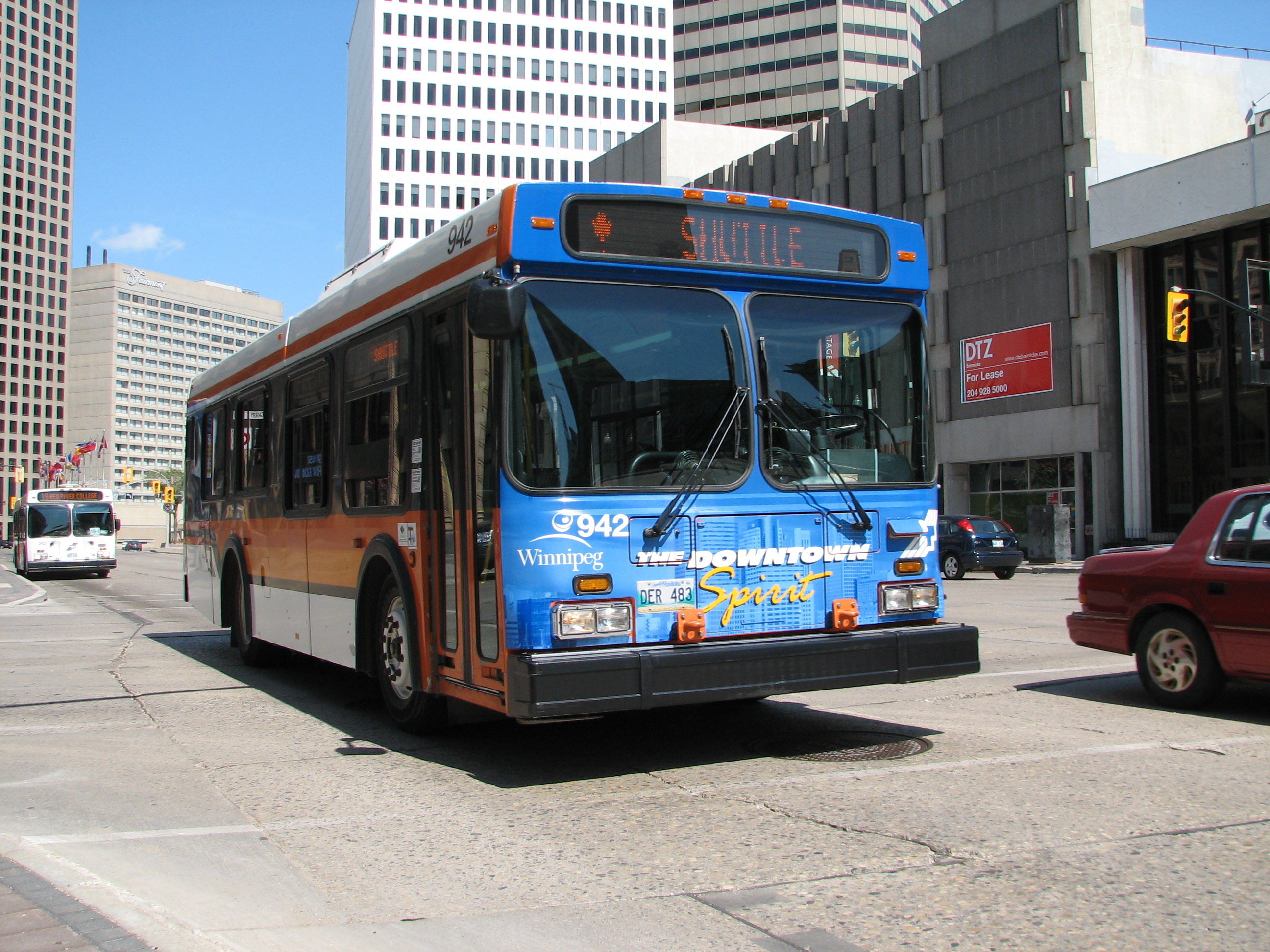
A former "Downtown Spirit" bus

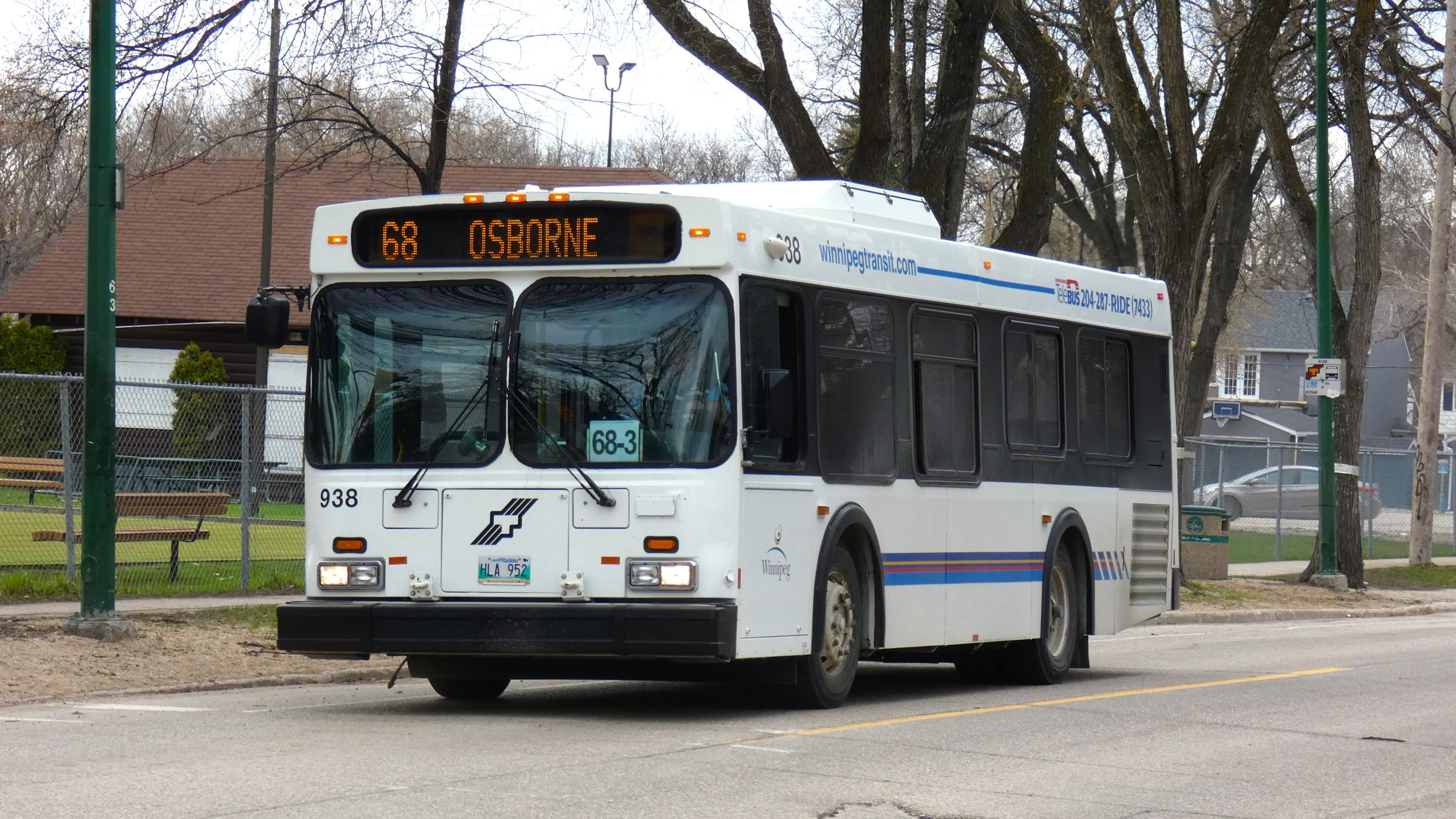
An NFI D30LF bus running along Route 68

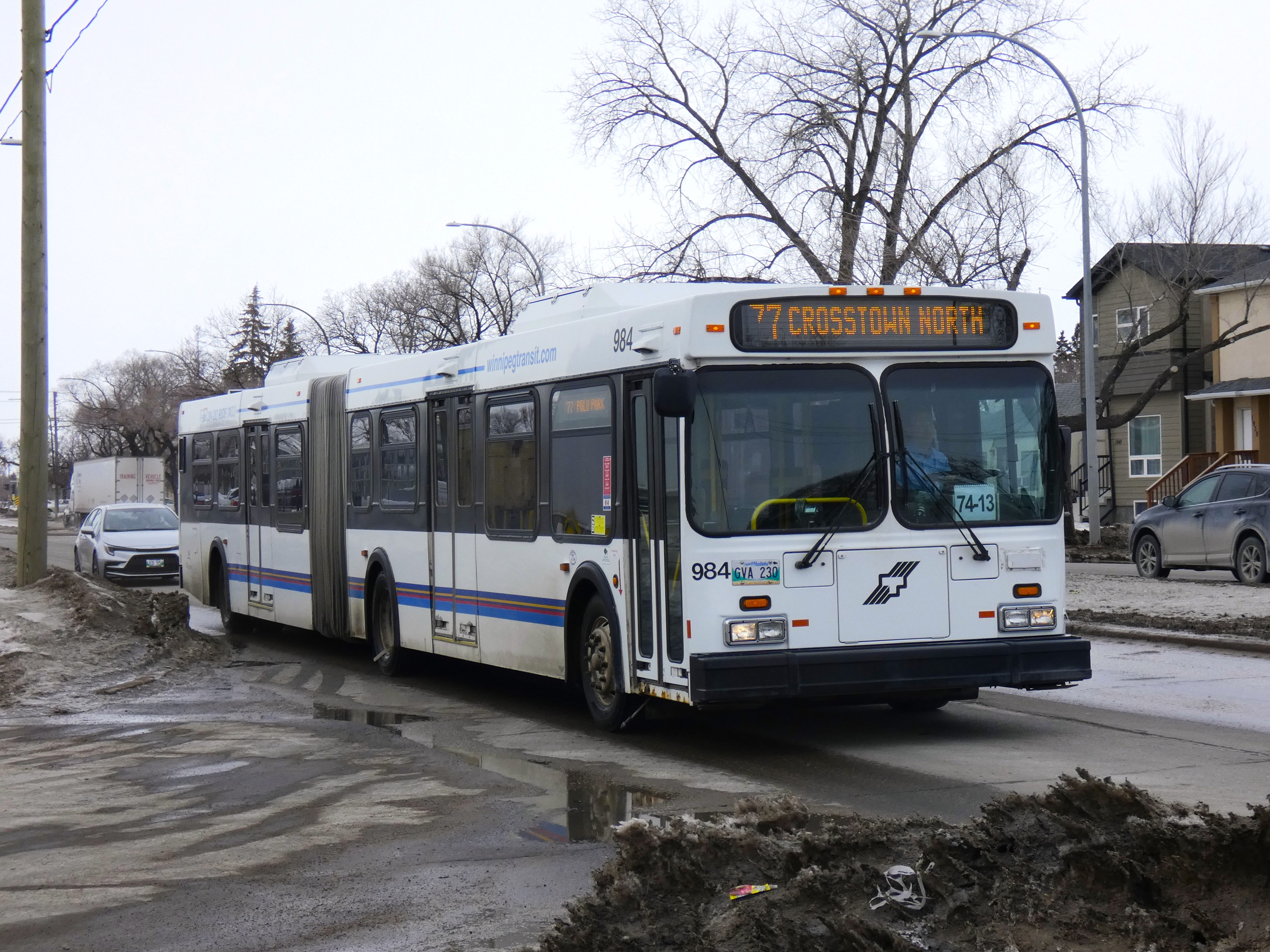
An NFI D60LF bus running along Route 77

As of July 2025, Winnipeg Transit operates 71 routes, of which:

- 1 is Rapid Transit
- 3 are Frequent Express (FX)
- 5 are Frequent (F)
- 9 are Direct (D)
- 10 are Connector
- 30 are Community
- 13 are Limited

Additionally, Winnipeg Transit also operates 12 On-Request zones. Winnipeg Transit operates accessible buses on all routes.

Every route has an official name as well as number, and are usually named based upon the main streets on which they travel, but can also be named after neighbourhoods they travel through.

The "Primary Network" consists of the Rapid Transit, Frequent Express, Frequent and Direct routes. The "Feeder Network" consists of the Connector, Community, Limited and On-Request routes.

The On-Request zones serve communities across Winnipeg, during periods of low ridership. Using an app, riders can book a trip between any two points within a given zone. Traveling between different zones is not possible, and requires transferring.

==== Special event shuttles ====
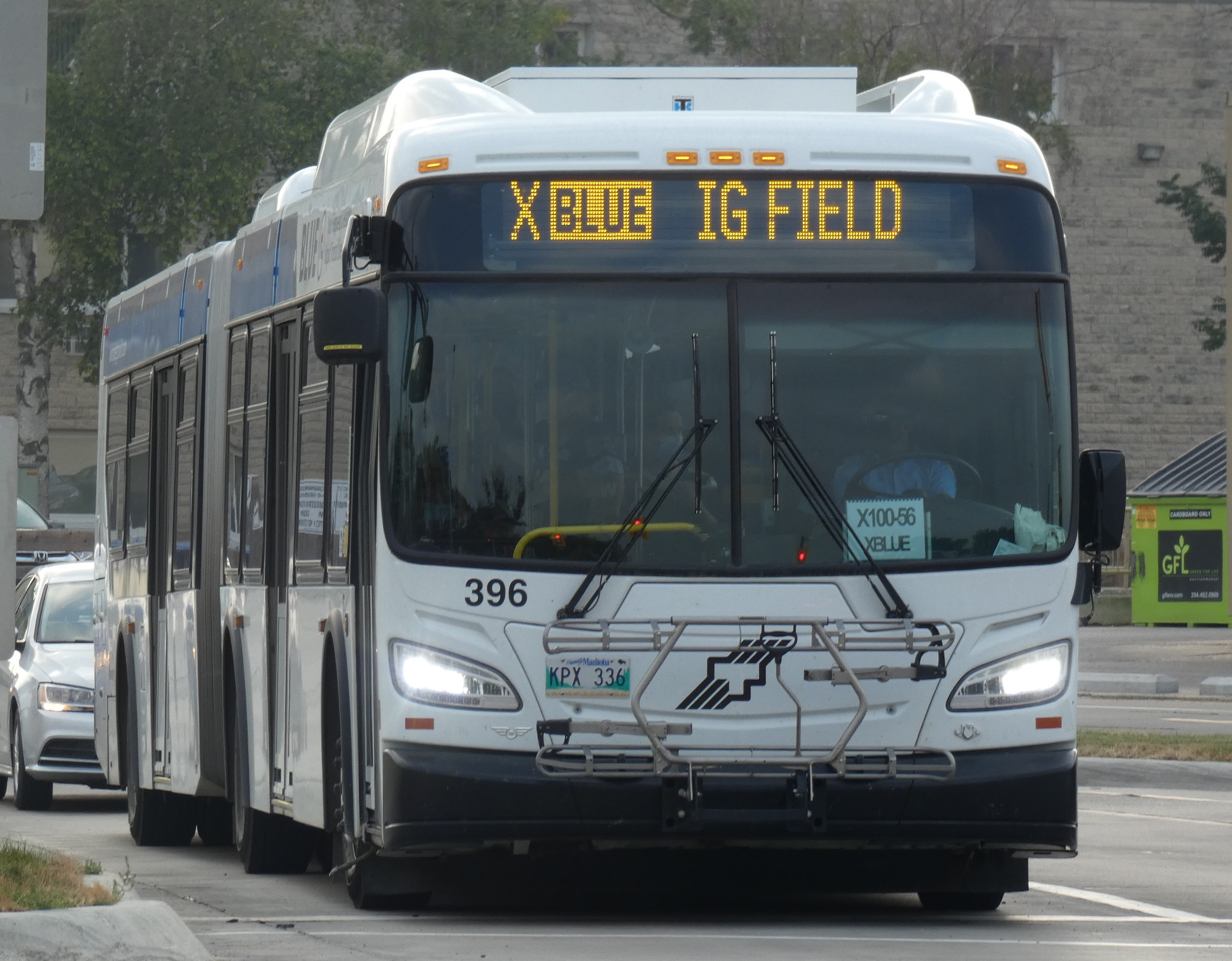
A bus running on an XBLUE to IG Field, before a Blue Bombers game.

During the Red River Ex annually in the month of June, Winnipeg Transit operates a shuttle between downtown Winnipeg and the Red River Exhibition grounds.

When the Winnipeg Blue Bombers are playing at Princess Auto Stadium during the summer and early fall months, Winnipeg Transit operates several shuttle buses to and from the stadium. These routes are labeled with an X before the route number, and have a destination of "Princess Auto Stadium" (example: "XF8 Princess Auto Stadium").

For many decades Winnipeg Transit operated a shuttle bus between Winnipeg and Birds Hill Provincial Park for the annual Winnipeg Folk Festival held in July. However, they did not do this for the 2019 Folk Festival due to the possible strike by the ATU, and because Winnipeg Transit did not win the competitive bid to provide this service. In 2020 and 2021, the Folk Festival was cancelled entirely. In 2022, the Folk Festival finally returned, and Winnipeg Transit provided the service to Birds Hill for the first time in 4 years.

=== Peggo ===
Winnipeg Transit introduced the Peggo electronic fare payment system in July 2016. This was designed to replace paper tickets and passes. However, the software used to update the balance on the cards has been problematic, sometimes causing the withdrawal of thousands of dollars from a passenger's credit card.

Winnipeg Transit planned to install wifi on twelve buses as a trial to commence in March 2018. The purpose of adding wifi to buses is for quicker updates of passengers' Peggo cards. Currently, Peggo data is updated overnight while buses are in their garage. This has led to fare dispute issues for some passengers who loaded their cards online.

=== Low Income Pass Program ===
The Low Income Pass Program was approved 14 to 1 by Council at a special meeting on 24 October 2019, with North Kildonan Councillor Jeff Browaty voting against the idea. To qualify for the lower income monthly transit pass, one must be a client of EIA, have income lower than the income cut-off, or be an immigrant that has resided in Winnipeg for less than 12 months. In its first year, the low income Adult pass will cost $70.70. Passengers will have to apply beginning April 2020 for the first passes to be issued in May.

WT currently sells 29,500 monthly passes. Lower costs for a pass will increase (estimated) sales to 78,000 by 2024, putting an extra strain on transit buses as more passengers ride the system. Additional buses may be required to handle the extra load.

=== Navigo ===
To facilitate use of the system, Winnipeg Transit's website provides a service called Navigo which allows users to specify a starting location and destination (either by address, Winnipeg landmark, or intersection) and the desired time of arrival or departure (specified as "before" or "after"). It then produces all the available bus routes that meet the criteria, estimating how much time is spent walking to bus stops and waiting for buses, as well as how many transfers are required to arrive at the destination.

=== Pass-ups ===
Since July 2019, Winnipeg Transit has been providing data on pass-ups on all bus routes. A pass-up is when a bus is too full to accept any more passengers. This is part of the city's open data initiative. Recent data showed that these 5 routes have the highest number of pass-ups, between September and December 2022: BLUE, 75 Crosstown East, 11 Portage-Kildonan, 60 Pembina, and 47 Transcona-Pembina.

== Operations ==
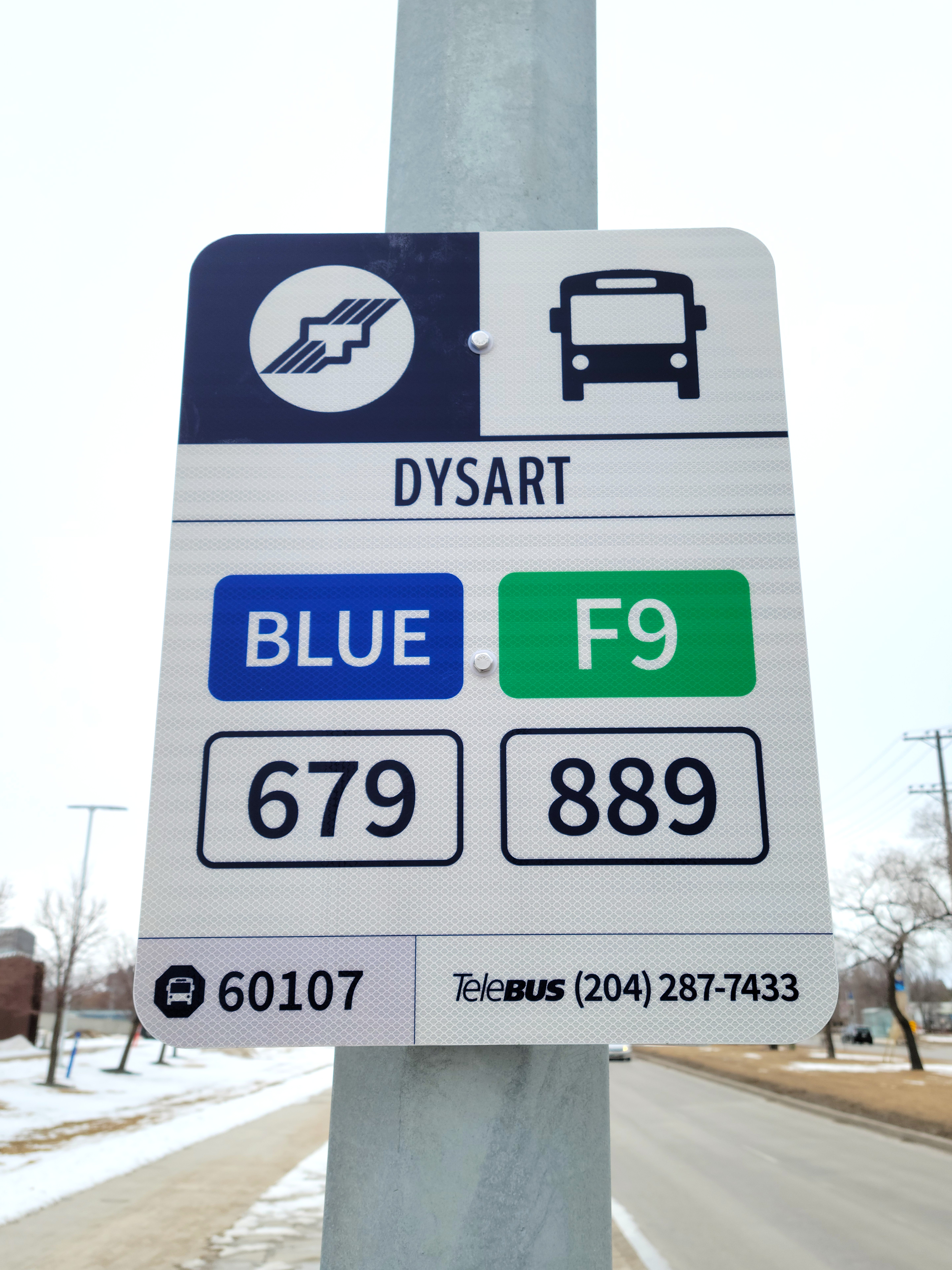
Bus stop at the University of Manitoba, showing typical signage

There are about 3,800 Winnipeg Transit bus stops, 800 bus shelters, and 1,500 transit benches. Larger bus stops and stations often include electronic signage, called "BUSwatch" signs. These signs provide live info on upcoming bus departures.

=== Fleet ===
Winnipeg Transit has a fleet of approximately 630 low-floor buses, supplied by New Flyer Industries. The fleet includes:

- 51 low-floor diesel articulated buses, 18.29 metres (60 ft) long
- 4 low-floor battery-electric articulated buses, 18.29 metres (60 ft) long
- 4 low-floor hydrogen-electric articulated buses, 18.29 metres (60 ft) long
- 27 low-floor battery-electric buses, 12.19 metres (40 ft) long
- 4 low-floor hydrogen-electric buses, 12.19 metres (40 ft) long
- over 570 low-floor diesel buses, 12.19 metres (40 ft) long
- 11 low-floor buses, 9.14 metres (30 ft) long

In late 2018, it was announced that Winnipeg Transit was in the process of receiving twenty-eight 18.29 metres (60 ft) articulated buses (numbered 371–398) from New Flyer that would be delivered in the latter half of 2019.

Winnipeg Transit has a fleet of historic buses that have been restored by the Manitoba Transit Heritage Association.

Modes of Winnipeg public transit
Mode	Date began	Date ceased
Omnibus	July 19, 1877	July 19, 1877 (one day)
Horsecar	October 20, 1882	June 1894
Electric railway	January 27, 1891	September 18, 1955 (Note: Last regular service ran Sunday Morning, September 18, 1955. Four streetcars ran during the formal closing ceremonies held September 19, 1955.)
Motor bus	May 1, 1918	present
Trolley coach	November 21, 1938	October 30, 1970
Motor bus busway (rapid transit)	April 8, 2012 (Note: Free rides were offered to the public on 5 April 2012)	present
Electric bus	November 29, 2014	present

=== Facilities ===
Winnipeg’s Transit Base

General information
- Location: 421 Osborne St., Winnipeg
- Opened: November 20, 1969
- Renovated: 1979

Technical details
- Grounds: over 25 acres (10 ha)

Status	Facility	Location	Description
Current	Winnipeg Transit Base; Fort Rouge Garage	421 Osborne St.	Built in 1969 on the site of the former Fort Rouge Streetcar Yard.
Current	North Garage	1520 Main St.	Built in 1954 on the pre-existing North Yards. Planned to be decommissioned by 2027.
Current	Brandon Garage	600 Brandon Ave.	Opened in February 2014
Future	Oak Point Garage	Intersection of Oak Point Highway and Selkirk Avenue	Planned to begin construction in 2025, and open in 2027. It would replace the current North Main Garage, costing an estimated $182.5 million.
Former	Main Carhouse/Winnipeg Electric Co. Garage	South side of Assiniboine Ave. (between Garry & Main St.). North side of Assiniboine Ave. (between Garry & Fort St.)	Composed of multiple buildings including garages, maintenance shops, and main office. It was demolished in October 1969, after the move to Fort Rouge Transit Base. The site is now home to Bonneycastle Park and the Fort Garry Place apartment buildings. It was also the site of the Street Railway Rink.
Former	St. James Garage	Polo Park (461 Century St.) - Route 90	It is now a U-Haul Moving and Storage Facility. It closed in June 1996.
Former	North Main Car Barn	1441 Main St. (between Polson & Luxton Ave.)	It was built in 1909 to store interurban streetcars belonging to Selkirk and others. Since being demolished, it is now the site of a No Frills Supermarket.
Former	South Carbarn & Fort Rouge Shop	West side of Osborne St. between Kylemore Ave. and Morley Ave.	From 1904 to 1954 it was a streetcar garage and a manufacturing shop where around 230 of Winnipeg's streetcars were built.
Former	Street Car Barn	Portage Ave. south (near Carlton St.)	1880s

== Major bus terminals ==
- Garden City Centre
- Graham Avenue Transit Mall (defunct)
- Kildonan Place
- Polo Park
- St. Vital Centre
- Unicity

Rapid Transit stations (see also Winnipeg Rapid Transit)

- Balmoral Station (defunct)
- Beaumont Station
- Chancellor Station
- Chevrier Station
- Clarence Station
- Fort Rouge Station
- Harkness Station
- Jubilee Station
- Markham Station
- Osborne Station
- Plaza Station
- Seel Station
- Southpark Station
- Stadium Station
- University of Manitoba Station
- St. Norbert Station

Park-and-ride locations

- Charleswood Centre
- Clarence Station
- Club Regent Casino
- Garden City Centre
- Grant & Cambridge
- Kildonan Place
- McPhillips Station Casino (defunct)
- Safeway (Pembina)
- Seel Station
- Southdale Centre
- Vista Place

== In popular culture ==
The song "Civil Twilight", by Winnipeg rock band The Weakerthans from their 2007 album Reunion Tour, is sung from the point of view of a Winnipeg Transit driver whose route passes the house where he lived with his former significant other before the failure of their relationship.

== See also ==
- Graham Avenue Transit Mall
- List of Winnipeg bus routes
- Transport in Winnipeg
  - List of Winnipeg City Routes
  - Winnipeg Area Transportation Study
- Winnipeg Bus Terminal
- Winnipeg Rapid Transit
