= Winnipeg Area Transportation Study =

1960s era transportation plan

The Winnipeg Area Transportation Study, or W.A.T.S. as it is commonly known, is a regional transportation plan created during the administration of the Metropolitan Corporation of Greater Winnipeg.

== Study Period ==
In 1962 Metro's Planning Division, headed by George Rich and Boris Hryhorczuk, set out to survey the daily commuting habits of metropolitan Winnipeg citizens. The preliminary plan included the circumferential Suburban Beltway, would double the amount of major thoroughfares and the new roadways would cost between C$100–200 million.

They officially announced the creation of the WATS group on December 11, 1963.

- February 1966, Volume 1: Base Conditions released.
- July 1966, Volume 2: Travel Analysis released.
- September 1968, Volume 3: Recommendations released.

== The Plan ==
The recommendations of the W.A.T.S. report was to construct 5 "radial" freeways, 1 suburban beltway, and one 8.7 kilometres (5.4 mi) underground subway line=

=== Freeways ===
- Northern Freeway — scuttled after opposition from a local school in 1979–1980.
- Southern Freeway — described in Plan Winnipeg literature as a "re-alignment" of Wilkes Ave.
- Western Freeway - along Silver Ave.
- Eastern Freeway
- Southeastern Freeway — would create a downtown bypass and link up with the Disraeli Freeway.
- Suburban Beltway — a ring-road a few kilometres inside the Perimeter Highway.

=== Subway ===
A 8.7 kilometres (5.4 mi), 11 station underground rapid transit line from Polo Park to Hespeler in Elmwood. Four of the stations would be located underground in the downtown Winnipeg area (Memorial, Donald, Fort, City Hall/Centennial Centre). The line would require 15 trains to start. During peak (rush) hours, trains would operate every two minutes. Park and Ride facilities and feeder buses oriented towards the rapid transit stations would complement the line. It was estimated that, in 1968 dollars the subway line would cost $158 million.

The precursor to the planned subway line was the Norman D. Wilson report, Future Development of the Greater Winnipeg Transit System published on March 4, 1959.

=== Surface bus ===
The W.A.T.S. report projected the need for 650 buses with a daily ridership of 285,000 by 1991.

== Aftermath ==
A $330,000 preliminary engineering study for the Sherbrook-McGregor Overpass was budgeted for in January 1969, the same month the W.A.T.S. study Volume 3 Recommendations were released.

Plans to construct the first segment of the W.A.T.S. freeway, the Sherbrook-McGregor Overpass, were continually delayed during the 1970s as the City studied the option of having the CP railyards moved. In 1979 it was estimated to cost about the same to relocate the CP railyards, C33.7 million, as it would be to construct three projects Sherbrook-McGregor Overpass, replace the Arlington Bridge, and upgrade the Salter Street Bridge at C$32.5 million.

In 1980-81 city transportation planners tried unsuccessfully to add the Northern Freeway to the city's five year Capital Budget. The Northern Freeway was to connect Sherbrook St. with McGregor St., creating the Sherbrook-McGregor Overpass. However, Sr. McNamara of the Rossbrook House opposed this and City Council ultimately voted against it.

Instead, Winnipeg Transit purchased feeder buses built by Orion Bus Industries of Ontario via the Urban Transportation Assistance Program (UTAP). The first of these buses were delivered in July 1981.

Another W.A.T.S. Freeway, the Southern, Sterling Lyon Parkway, which includes the Kenaston Underpass started construction in June 2004, and successfully completed in November 2006 at a cost of $43 million.
