= Graham Avenue Transit Mall =

Bus-only transit mall in downtown Winnipeg, Canada

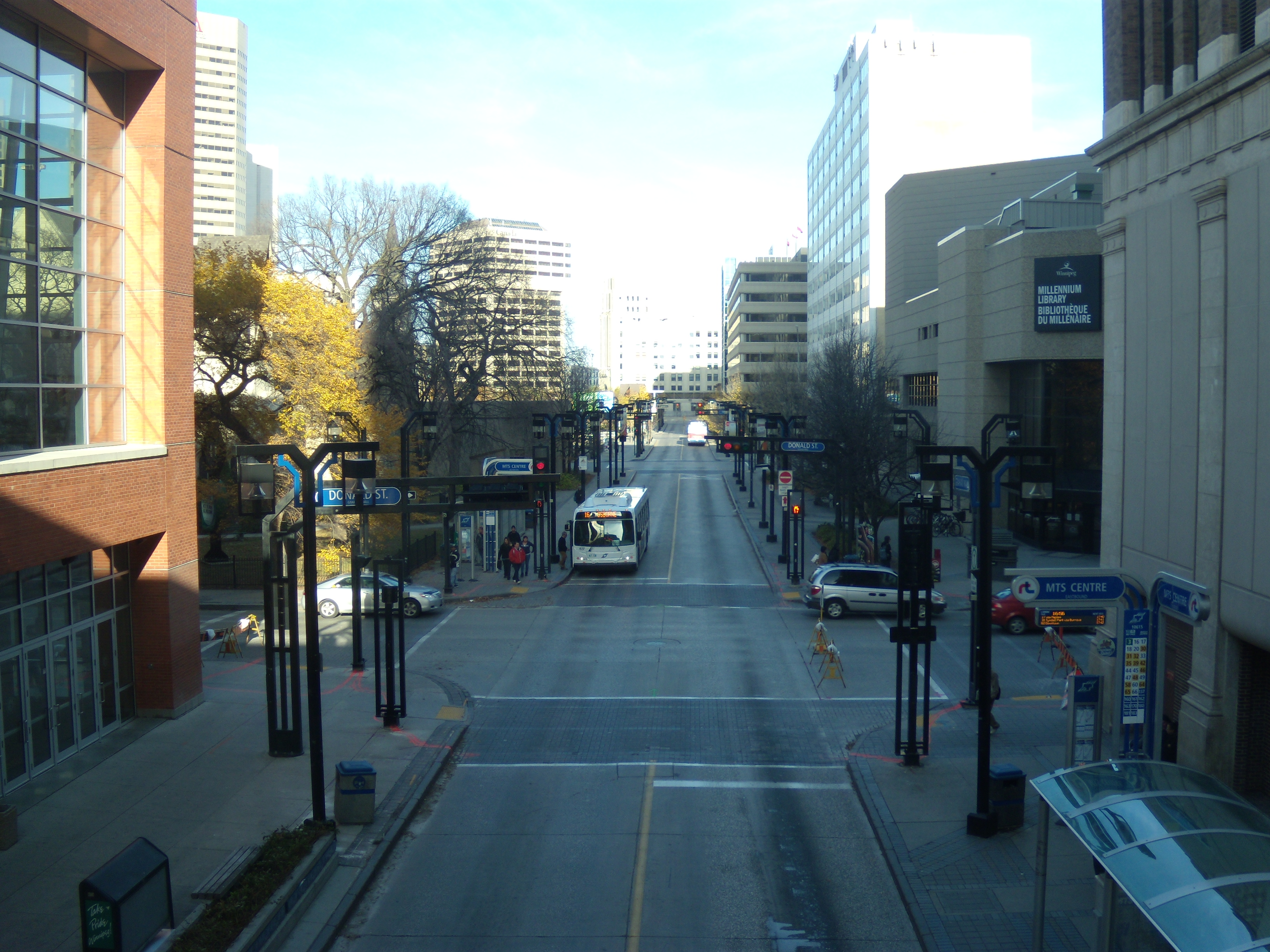
- Type: Transit mall
- From: Vaughan St
- To: Main St

Construction
- Construction start: May 1994
- Completion: September 1995
- Demolished: June 29, 2025

The Graham Avenue Transit Mall is a 9-block transit mall in downtown Winnipeg that was mostly reserved for Winnipeg Transit buses, as well as cyclists and pedestrians until 2025.

Having been in the planning stages since the 1970s, Graham Mall was completed in 1995. The Mall saw 1,800 buses and 100,000 transit users every day. It is built mostly of highway-grade concrete and featured cobblestone brick at all intersections.

In 2025, the transit mall was decommissioned, and all routes were moved off Graham Ave on June 29, 2025. The City of Winnipeg plans to convert Graham Avenue into a "vibrant people-first destination".

== History ==
Before the Mall was constructed, planning for a transit corridor in Winnipeg's downtown had been debated for several years since at least 1990. Construction of the Graham Avenue Transit Mall began in May 1994, and after two years (1994-95) opened on September 16, 1995. Then city councilors Terry Dugald and Glen Murray were key supporters of the project, with Dugald commenting that the project would "Revitalize the whole area".

When it was completed, the Transit Mall featured granite curbs, heated bus shelters, and unique streetlights which were intended to provide better lighting for pedestrians. Blue holland pavers were used to decorate the sidewalks.

In recent years, road work around the mall began to degrade and is in need of serious maintenance work on concrete and cobblestones to keep the roadway smooth. In December 2018, to improve safety, a Transit Inspector Station was constructed at Graham Avenue and Fort Street.

In 2021, City council approved the Winnipeg Transit Master Plan, which advocated for reducing the number of routes going through downtown. This meant that most routes using the transit mall would be discontinued. An exception is the BLUE route which would be moved to Portage Avenue. Throughout May and June 2025, the city dismantled physical infrastructure such as shelters, benches and electronic bus stop signs, with the bus routes being moved or discontinued on June 29, 2025. After the new network launched, only two bus stops remained on Graham Ave which are between Garry and Main Street.

== Future use ==
As part of CentrePlan 2050, which aims to get more people living and visiting Downtown, bus service moved off Graham Avenue starting June 29, 2025 with the launch of the Primary Transit Network. Several options of how to use the space were proposed by the city for public engagement, with varying levels of emphasis on uses like green spaces, recreation, and celebration, however, many survey respondents indicated that some public transportation should remain on Graham Avenue, to make working and visiting Downtown faster and easier.

After bus routes were removed, the city launched a "pedestrian and placemaking" pilot project, aimed at maintaining foot traffic and creating a more pedestrian friendly area. This included repainting the street and adding several art installations and picnic benches. However, after only a month, paint began to peel, and the area saw a noticeable reduction in foot traffic. Some businesses along the west part of Graham Ave have reported a drop in business since bus routes were removed from the street.

== Bus routes ==
The following are bus routes that operated on all or part of the Graham Avenue Transit Mall as of March 2024.

- BLUE
- 16 Selkirk / Osborne
- 17 McGregor
- 18 North Main / Corydon
- 20 Watt / Academy
- 30 Inkster Park Express
- 31 Keewatin Express
- 32 North Main Express
- 33 Maples
- 34 McPhillips Super Express
- 35 Maples Super Express
- 42 Plessis Express
- 44 Grey
- 45 Talbot
- 46 Transcona Express
- 48 McMeans Express
- 49 Dugald
- 58 Dakota Express
- 60 Pembina
- 68 Grosvenor

== Major businesses on the Transit Mall ==
- Manitoba Hydro
- Holy Trinity Anglican Church
- Millennium Library
- Winnipeg Police HQ
- Cityplace (shopping centre & offices)
- CTV Winnipeg
- Canada Life Centre
- True North Square
- Winnipeg Square an underground shopping centre
  - Artis Reit Residential Tower (300 Main), a 42-storey apartment complex
  - GoodLife Fitness Centre (330 Main)
  - 360 Main
- Cargill Building
- 200 Graham Ave.
- CDI College
- Royal Winnipeg Ballet School
