= Winnipeg Bus Terminal =

Former intercity bus terminal in Winnipeg, Canada

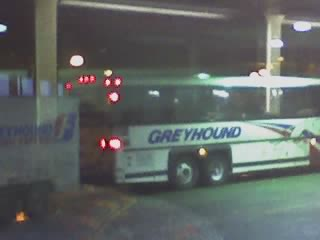
- A Greyhound bus waiting at the old terminal in downtown Winnipeg

General information
- Location: 2015 Wellington Ave, Winnipeg, MB; R3H 1H5; Canada
- Coordinates: 49°54′09″N 97°13′33″W
- Elevation: 239 m (784 ft)
- Owner: Greyhound Canada
- Distance: 8.1 km (5.0 mi) from Portage & Main
- Connections: 15 Sargent-Mountain; 20 Academy-Watt

Construction
- Structure type: At-grade
- Platform levels: 1
- Parking: 29

Other information
- Status: Unstaffed
- IATA code: YWG

History
- Opened: August 15, 2009; 17 years ago
- Closed: October 31, 2018; 7 years ago
Location

The Winnipeg Bus Terminal was an intercity bus station, located beside the Winnipeg International Airport.

== History ==
=== Union Bus Depot ===
The Union Bus Depot was constructed in the 1930s, opened on December 12, 1936, and operated out of 264 Hargrave St., a site where True North Square development currently stands.

Bus lines that operated from Union Bus Depot were Greyhound Canada, Grey Goose, Eagle (St. Anne), Beaver (Selkirk), Cross Country (Ft. Whyte), Eastern Bus Lines (Birds Hill), Southern (Ste. Adolphe), Sonnichsen (Headingley), Riverbend (Ste. Adolphe), Thiessen (Stonewall, Stony Mountain).

=== Winnipeg Intercity Bus Terminal ===
In December 1962 plans were announced to replace the old Union Bus Depot between Hargrave and Carlton St. to the Winnipeg Bus Terminal fronted on Portage Avenue between Colony and Balmoral Streets and be named the Mall Centre. The project on 2.5 acres (1.0 ha) of land would cost $4.5 million and would include a parkade and a 7-storey office building and 6-storey hotel. It was designed by architectural firm of Moody, Moore, Whenham and Partners, architects of the Centennial Concert Hall a few years later, along with Edmonton-based John McIntosh. The new bus terminal would be able to park up to 15 intercity buses at once.

PCL began demolition of existing building(s) at the site began in the spring of 1963. Construction crews had to dig 21 metres (70 ft) to reach bedrock level, although they expected to dig no more than 15 metres (50 ft) to do so.

The Mall Centre and Bus Depot opened on October 15, 1964. It covers 38,000 sq ft (3,500 m^{2}) along with the Mall Centre Hotel. The 'Park-M-All' for up to 400 vehicles was included in the development. A Dutch Treat Cafeteria was the initial fast food restaurant that set up shop in the Bus Depot.

For several years, Salisbury House restaurant and another establishment, a small convenience store operated from the bus terminal

In 1980s the Mall Centre Hotel was demolished to make way for the 160-room Relax Plaza (360 Colony St.) which was constructed in 1986, and later branded as a Holiday Inn Downtown and apartment complex.

=== Winnipeg James Richardson International Airport ===
Greyhound Canada announced in March 2008 it would move the Winnipeg bus terminal from the Mall Centre in downtown Winnipeg to a new C$6.3 million building with a single storey structure with separate areas for freight and passengers inside of a 930 m^{2} (10,000 ft^{2}) of passenger space and 930 m^{2} (10,000 ft^{2}) of cargo processing space at the Winnipeg International Airport. The terminal moved operations on August 15, 2009, where it had been for 45 years.

The terminal was a hub for Greyhound, with buses originating from and travelling to Vancouver; Edmonton; Calgary; Medicine Hat; and Toronto. On October 30, 2018, Greyhound Canada stopped serving western Canada, causing the closure of the bus terminal. The terminal building was demolished in 2022.

=== Repurposing Mall Centre Bus Depot ===
Today, the old Winnipeg Bus Terminal on Portage Avenue has become Balmoral Station and functions as a termination or pass-thru point for Winnipeg Transit buses. A University of Winnipeg Student Centre currently occupies all of the space within the office complex (491 Portage Ave.).

=== Successor ===
Most regional bus lines and inter-provincial lines like Ontario Northland Transportation Commission and Rider Express use Maple Bus Lines terminal at 936 Sherbrook St, and ONTC arrives Southdale Shopping Centre at 147 Vermillion Rd (near Royal Canadian Mint) also.

== See also ==
Selkirk Transit

Greyhound Canada
