= Winnipeg Square =

Mixed-use complex in Manitoba

Coordinates: 49.8940°N 97.1385°W

Shops of Winnipeg Square
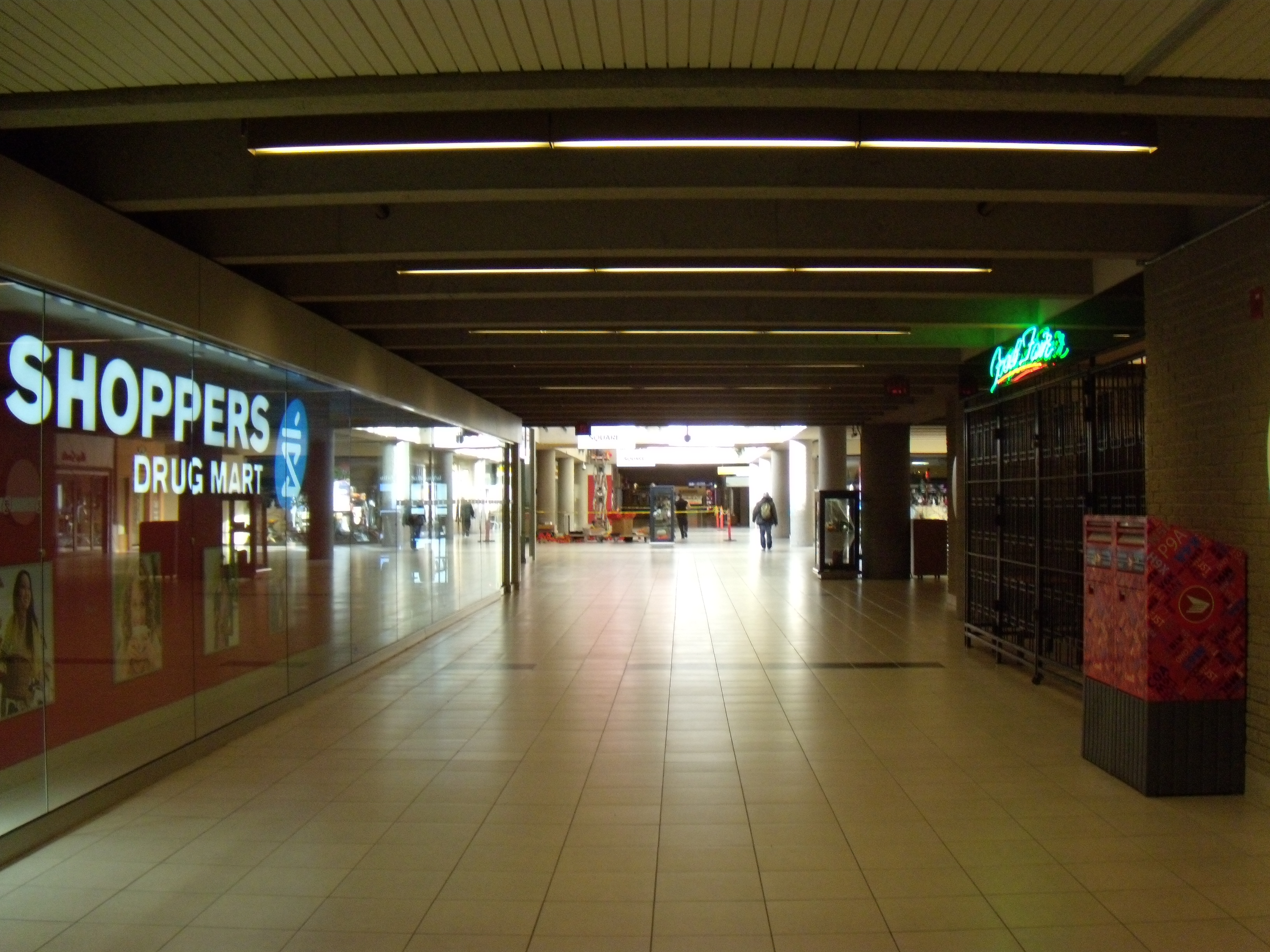
- Shoppers Drug Mart and the food court
- Location: Downtown Winnipeg
- Address: 360 Main St. Winnipeg, Manitoba R3C 3Z3
- Opened: July 24, 1980; 46 years ago
- Developer: Trizec Corporation
- Manager: Frank Sherlock
- Owner: Crown Realty Partners (until June 2010), Artis REIT (since June 2010)
- Num. of stores: 45
- Floors: 2
- Public transit: Winnipeg Transit; BLUE FX2 FX3 FX4 F7 D12 D13 D16

Winnipeg Square (also known as the Shops of Winnipeg Square) is an underground shopping mall located at Portage and Main in downtown Winnipeg, Manitoba, Canada. It was built in 1979 by Smith Carter Parkin for the Trizec Corporation, and has 45 stores and restaurants.

It includes the 300 Main apartment block, 330 Main surface level retail complex, and the 360 Main Commodity Exchange Tower (also known as the Trizec Building). Winnipeg Square is connected to the Winnipeg Walkway through the Concourse which links all four corners of the city's main office district via an underground roundabout.

It has been estimated that 16,000 people pass through Winnipeg Square each weekday.

== History ==
The mall was purchased from Oxford Properties Group and GE Capital Canada Inc in September 2007 by Crown Realty Partners, a Toronto-based company. The purchase included both the Winnipeg Square shopping mall and the former Commodity Exchange tower, now known as 360 Main for approximately $102.5 million.

In 2008, the owner of the Shops of Winnipeg Square began a $3 million upgrade to Winnipeg Square and the lobby to 360 Main. In 2010, Artis Real Estate Investment Trust acquired the remaining 62% stake in the former Commodity Exchange Tower/Winnipeg Square complex for $70.7 million.

The Winnipeg Square parkade is a 936-stall heated parking garage located between Portage Avenue and Graham Avenue, and Main Street and Fort Street. According to city documents, the parkade made a $1.5 million profit in 2008. In 2009, the City of Winnipeg sold the parkade to the owners of the Commodity Exchange and Winnipeg Square for $23.6 million. The sale involved $400,000 in real-estate fees paid to Shindico, the Winnipeg firm that brokered the deal.

Next to Winnipeg Square was the prairie regional headquarters of Scotiabank, at 200 Portage Ave., a five-storey building that opened on September 13, 1979. Scotiabank has since moved their headquarters to the more modern True North Square at 242 Hargrave St., while maintaining a branch at 200 Portage Ave. featuring a more prominent street entrance (under construction).

As part of the 42-storey 300 Main apartment complex construction, Winnipeg Square is getting a makeover. A pair of escalators were constructed. A GoodLife Fitness gym is being constructed at 330 Main that will open in 2020.

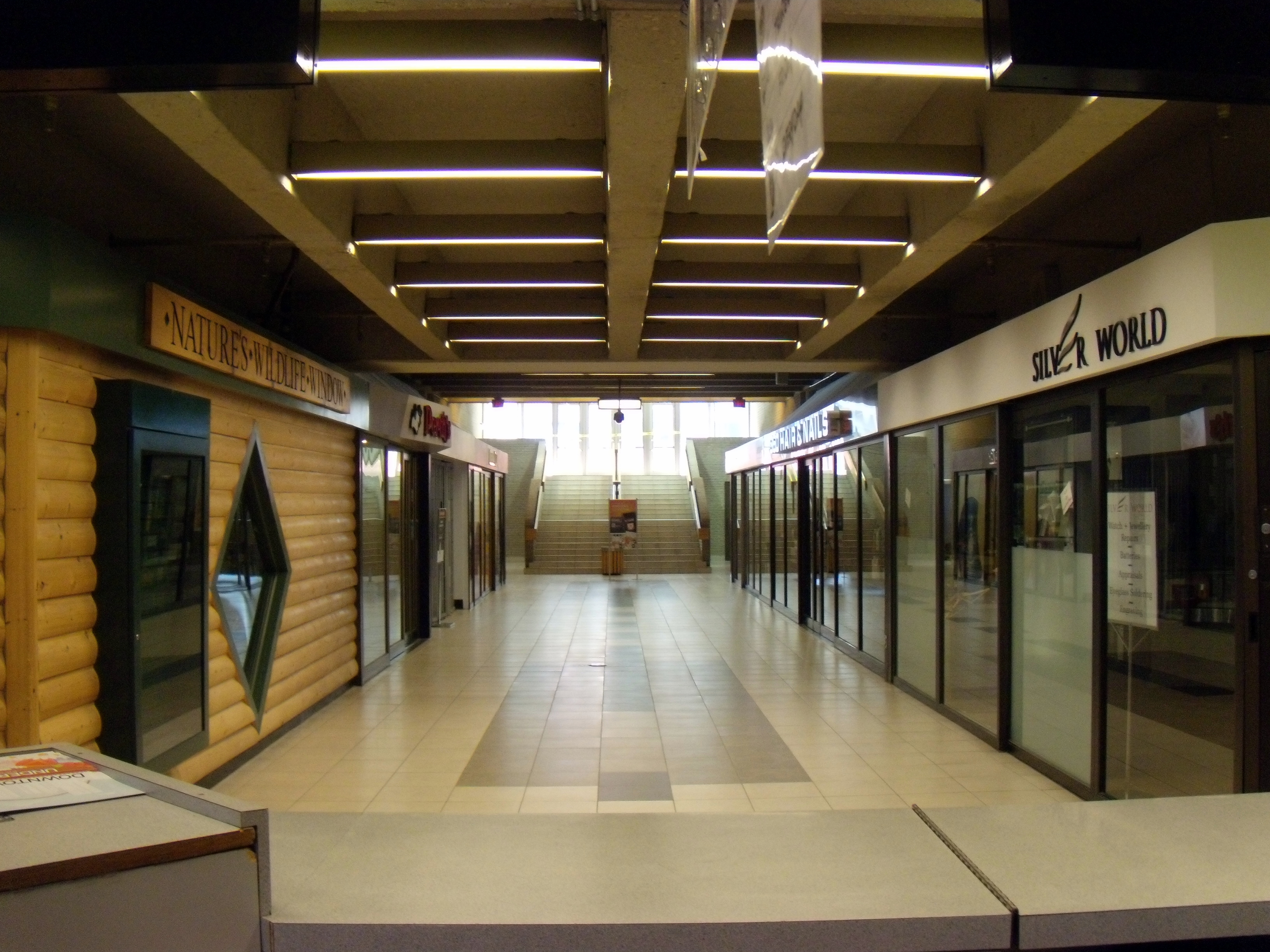
Shops in Winnipeg Square

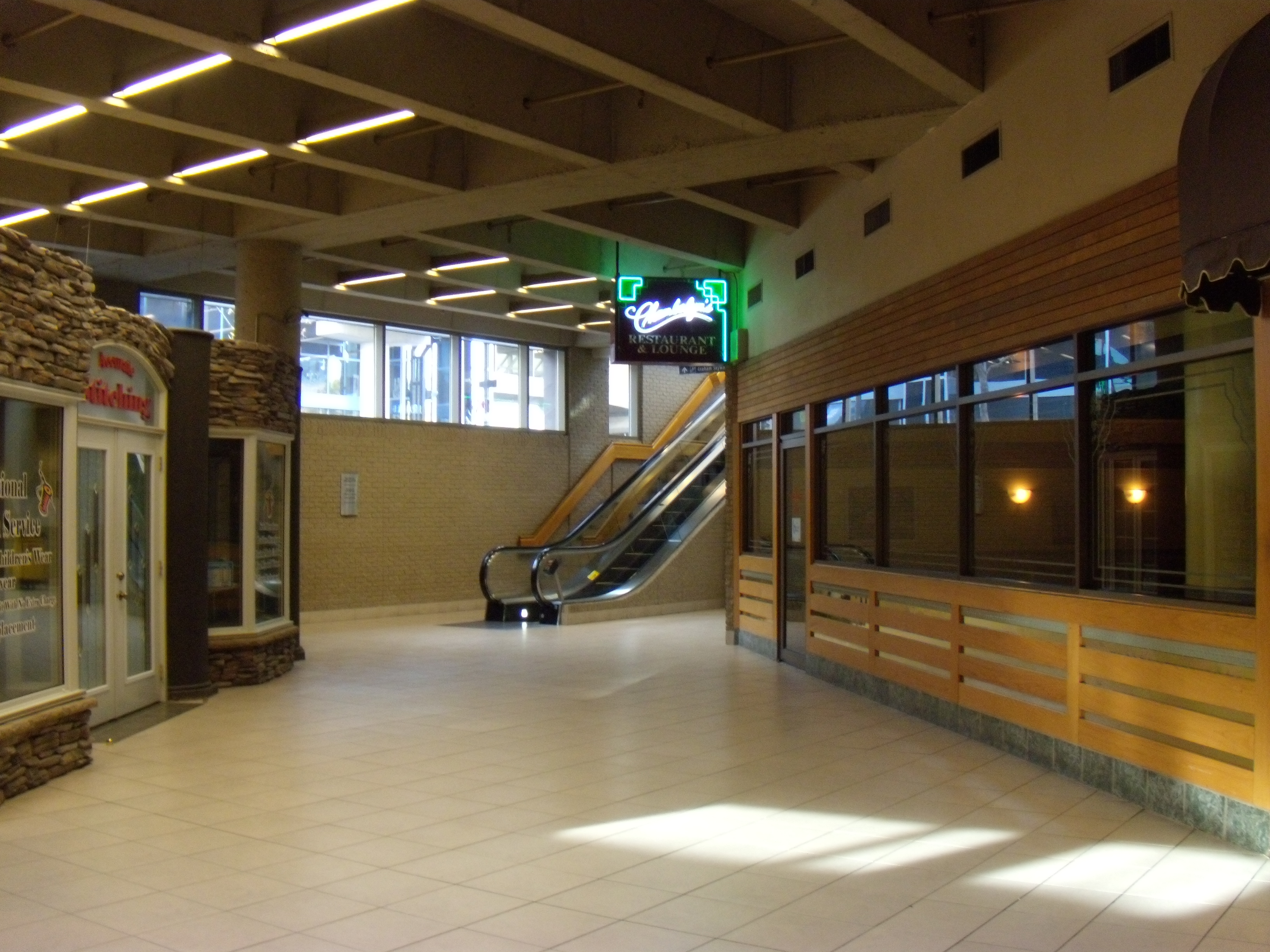
Shops in Winnipeg Square

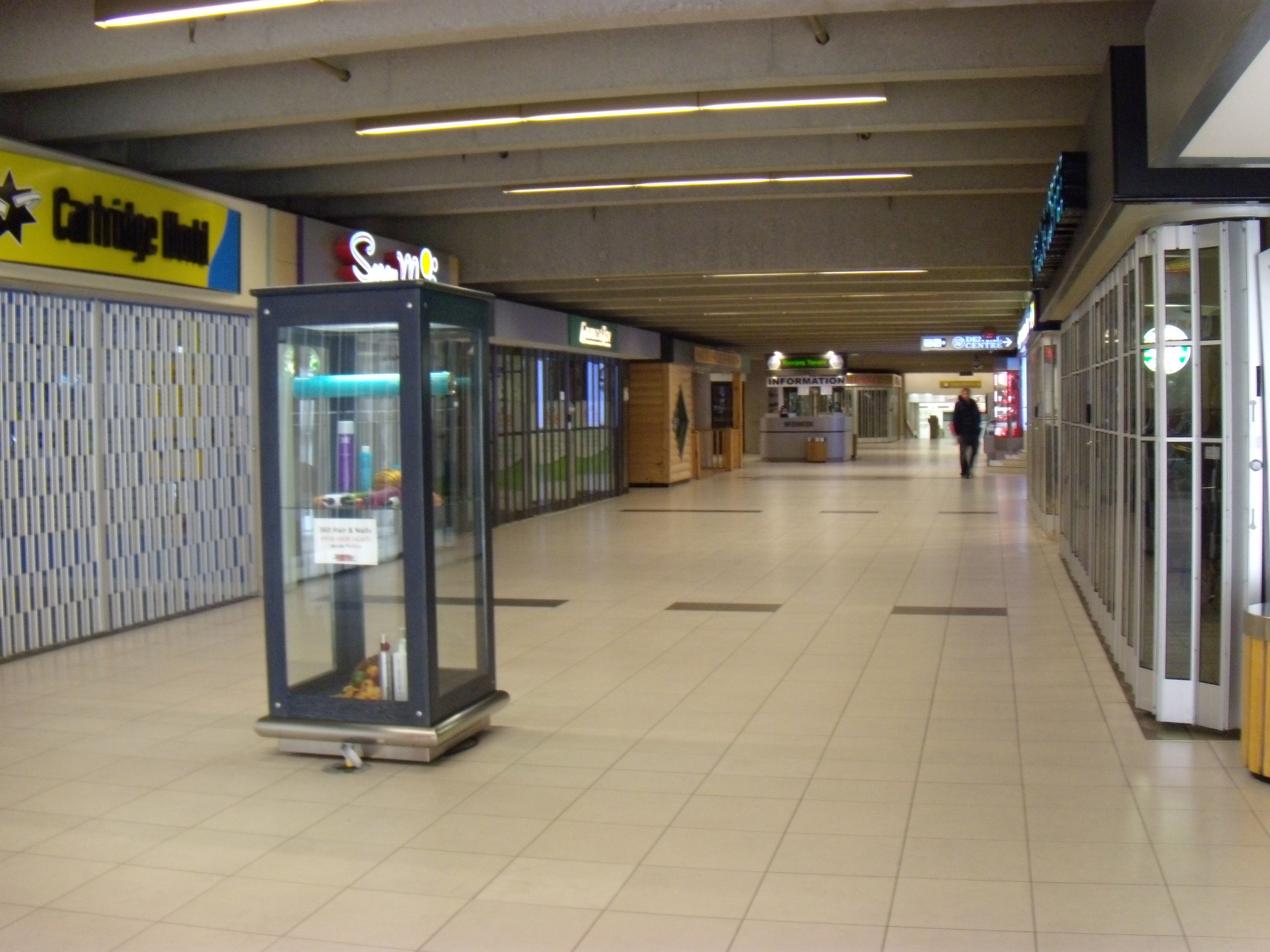
Shops in Winnipeg Square

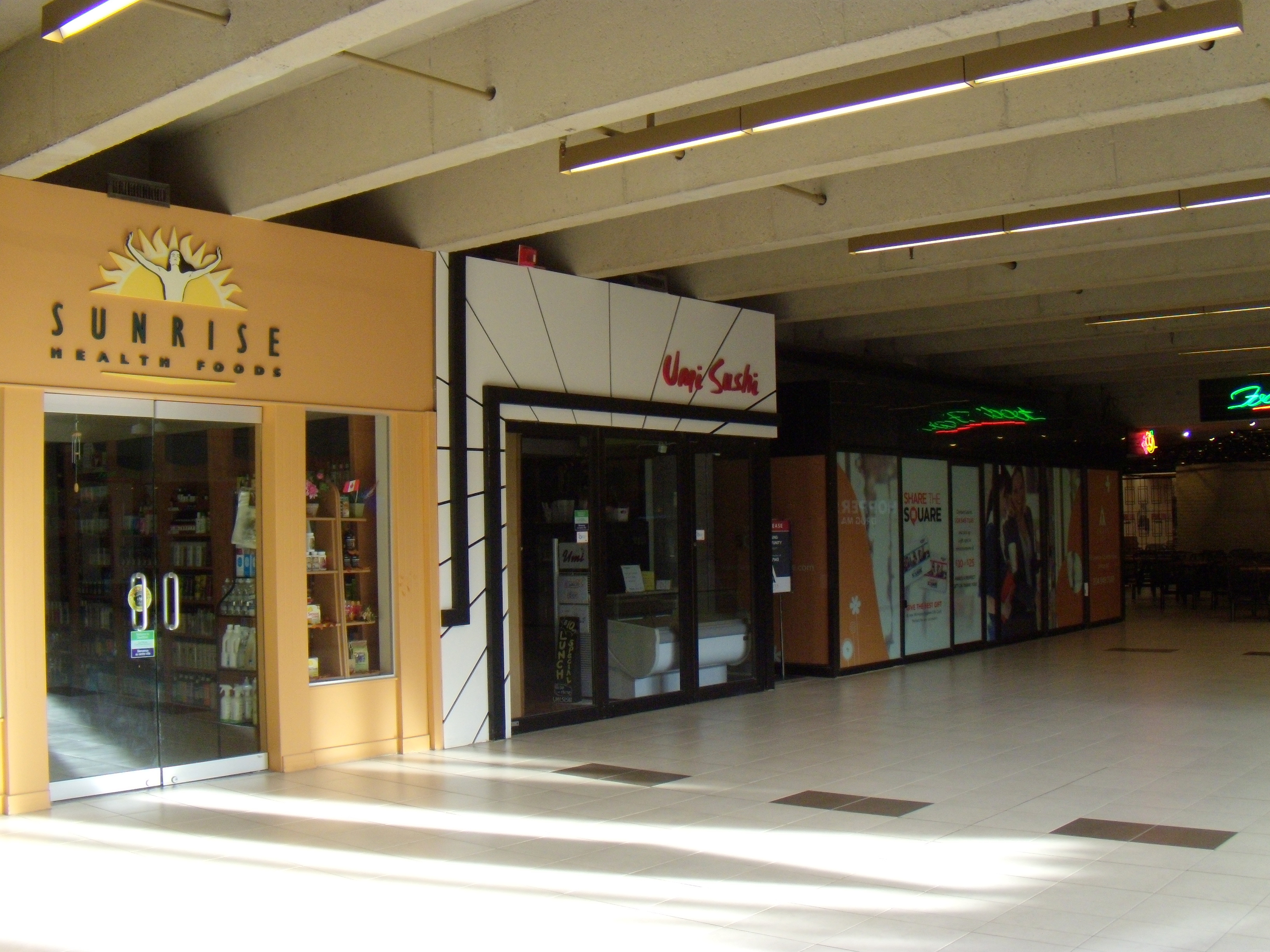
Restaurants in Winnipeg Square

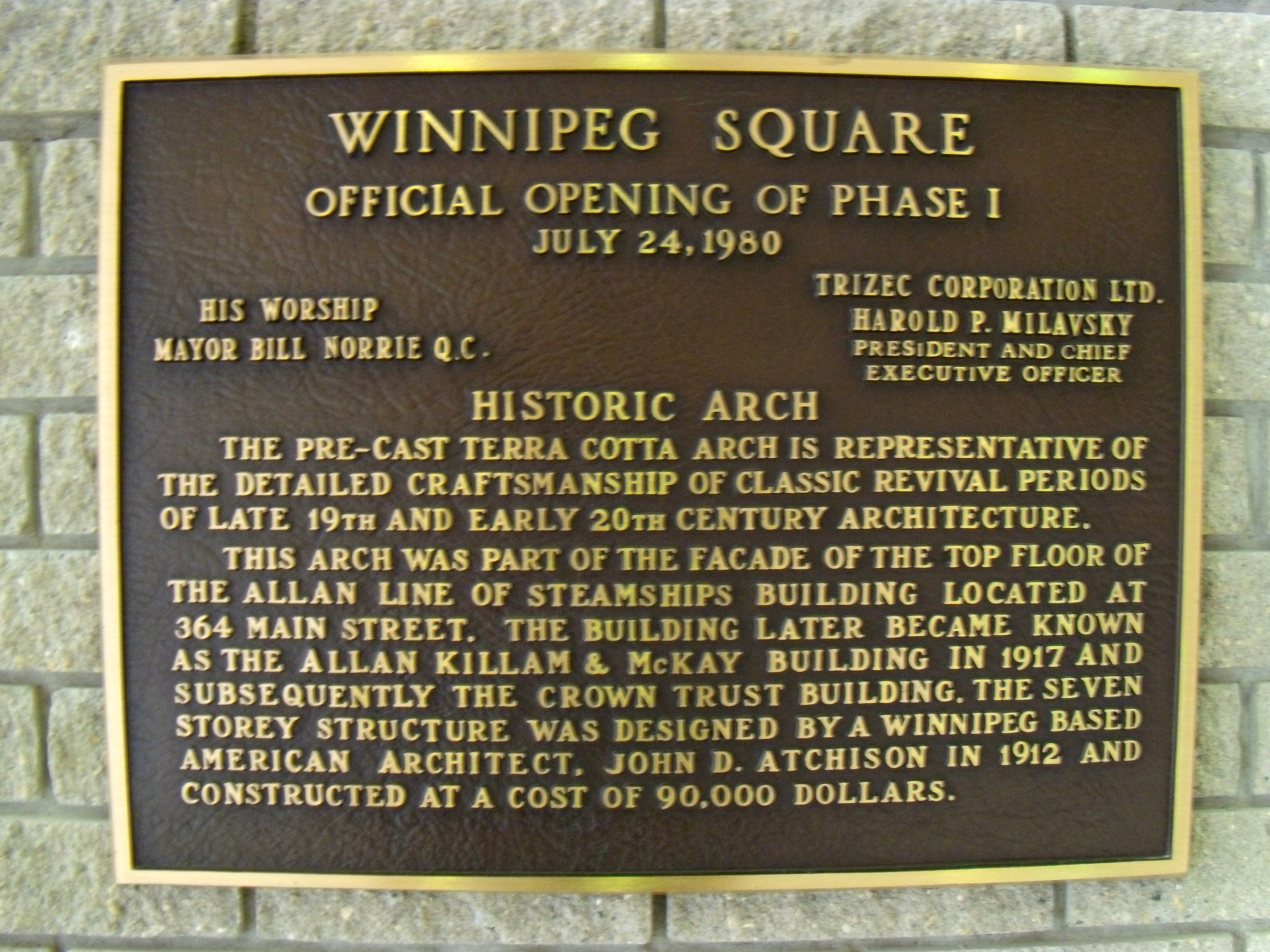
Plaque commemorating opening of Phase I
