= Selkirk Transit =

Municipal public transit in Manitoba

- Parent: City of Selkirk
- Founded: 30 May 2011
- Headquarters: 630 Sophia Street; Selkirk, Manitoba
- Locale: Selkirk, Manitoba
- Service type: bus service
- Routes: 1
- Stops: 74
- Destinations: City of Selkirk
- Fleet: 5 buses
- Daily ridership: 84 (annual daily average)
- Operator: Selkirk Transit Authority
- Chief executive: Duane Nicol
- Website: www.myselkirk.ca/community-services/public-transportation/

Selkirk Transit is a provider of public transportation based in Selkirk, Manitoba, Canada. Initiated in 2011, the service operates a single loop through the city. Selkirk commenced its new service with one month fare-free introductory period. Service was initially provided on weekdays from 6:00 AM–6:00 PM and on Saturdays from 8:00 AM–6:00 PM. The regular fare is $2, which has not changed since the bus system was first introduced. The bus runs once per hour; the entire route takes one hour from start to finish, with the same stop serviced at the same minute of every hour (i.e. stop #2, which is the Gaynor Family Regional Library, is serviced at 8:01, 9:01, 10:01, etc.).

When Selkirk Transit began operating in 2011, the ridership total for the year was 13,502. By 2024, ridership had increased to 35,642. This amounts to 685 riders a week in 2024, or an average of 114 riders per day of operation (not accounting for variation between weekday and Saturday service). On 30 April 2025, the City of Selkirk announced that in response to public demand, transit service would be extended an additional four hours on weekdays, running from 6:00 AM-10:00 PM starting 5 May; an additional stop was added, as well. Residents had expressed a desire for evening service, with some residents indicating this would provide them with more job flexibility, safety and convenience; "It's the biggest request people have," as reported by Selkirk Transit Manager of Transportation Services.

As part of the Government of Canada's commitment to long-term transit funding, $120 million in funding over ten years was announced for public transportation in Manitoba, split between Winnipeg, Brandon, and Selkirk. This funding was provided through the Canada Public Transit Fund, and would ensure support from 2026 through 2036. Intended for capital investment, the funding would support each city in upgrading, replacing and modernizing their public transit infrastructure. The vast majority of the money was allocated for Winnipeg (~$11.5M/year), with Selkirk's share approximately $57,000 per year. The City's Chief Administrative Officer indicated that the funding would be used to invest in better buses and long-term planning, including a transition to low-to-no-emission vehicles, which have higher initial costs but significantly lower operating costs. As of the March 2025 announcement, Selkirk Transit only had one hybrid mobility bus in its fleet.

== Selkirk to Winnipeg commuter bus ==
=== Beaver Bus Lines (discontinued) ===
The earliest mention of Beaver Bus Lines dates back to July 1946 when the company applied to serve employees of Canada Cement Company in Fort Whyte and be allowed to use all Winnipeg Electric bus stops along Pembina Hwy. as well as bus stops between the cement plant and the Union Bus Depot on Hargrave St. at Graham Ave.

In February 1948 St. Vital Council met with representatives of Winnipeg Electric and Beaver Bus Lines to serve St. Mary's Rd. and St. Anne's Rd. between Berrydale and Lot 62 and Berrydale and the Sanatorium (now St. Amant) with fares set at 5 cents and would be partly subsidized by Winnipeg Electric. However, by 9 of that year, Beaver Bus had proposed to cut back or cancel service to St. Vital. Homeowners in the area, represented by the St. Vital Ratepayers Assoc., organized to oppose the cuts in service. However, citing "poor road conditions" in St.Vital, Beaver permanently discontinued service to the municipality on July 12, 1952. To compensate, Winnipeg Electric offered to pick up the service from Beaver, but that service provided would be minimal at best.

In September 1948 Winnipeg Electric Company sold their Winnipeg, Selkirk, and Lake Winnipeg Railway to Beaver Bus Lines for $200,000 and Beaver immediately cancelled the commuter rail route then replaced it with a diesel bus. There were issues at the time of the purchase whether the Union agreement, set to expire in March 1949, could be carried over to the bus line company.

By May 1949, Beaver had applied to the Public Utility Board to increase fares between Winnipeg and Selkirk, due to 'tremendous cost' of operating the service. Politicians from the R.M. of St. Andrews, West St. Paul, and the Town of Selkirk said costs should not have increased just because ownership was transferred from Winnipeg Electric to Beaver Bus Lines the year prior. The new fares were approved the next month. Prior to the rate increase, a book of 20 tickets could be purchased for $1.50. Now the fare would jump to 20 tickets for $2.50, an increase of over 86%. Allegations that Winnipeg Electric was being discriminatory to the municipalities that it served in its fares were responded to by Beaver Bus to eliminate unfair fares by adjusting them accordingly.

In October 1964, Beaver Bus moved its Winnipeg terminal from the Union Bus Depot on Hargrave St. (now the site of True North Sq.) to the Winnipeg Bus Depot on Balmoral St. (now Winnipeg Transit's Balmoral Station).

As of July 1, 2016, Beaver Bus Lines has discontinued this service.

Selkirk was connected directly to Winnipeg via a route run by private operator Beaver Bus Lines. The first bus would leave Selkirk at 6:15 AM on weekdays and 7:50 AM on Saturdays. The final departure from Winnipeg would occur at 10:00 PM on weekdays and 6:00 PM on Saturdays. Intermediary destinations along the route include the villages of Lockport and St. Andrews in the RM of St. Andrews and the villages of Middlechurch and Rivercrest in the RM of West St. Paul. The fare was $9 to go from Selkirk to Winnipeg, or $17 for a two-way fare.

The Selkirk to Winnipeg service had daily ridership of 400–500, but ridership went down after the City of Selkirk introduced its own transit service, Selkirk Transit, in 2011, so the route was cancelled.

Its operations garage was based at 175 Horace Ave. in St. Boniface and later moved to 339 Archibald, also in St. Boniface.

=== Exclusive Bus Lines (Discontinued) ===
As of July 4, 2016, Exclusive Bus Lines had a route to replace the Beaver Bus Lines route. Buses ran Monday to Friday from 6:00 AM to 8:00 PM. Intermediary destinations along the route included the villages of Lockport and St. Andrews in the RM of St. Andrews and the villages of Middlechurch and Rivercrest in the RM of West St. Paul.

The fare was $11 to go from Selkirk to Winnipeg, or $20 for a day pass. The fare was reduced for shorter trips.

Express buses ran with reduced stops that took 45 minutes, compared to the regular 55 minutes.

As of September 1, 2017 this service has been discontinued due to low ridership.

=== Kasper Route (Discontinued) ===
Kasper Transport took over from Exclusive Bus Lines the Winnipeg-Selkirk commuter bus in September 2017.

Kasper offered mini-bus service from Winnipeg to Selkirk. A trip between Selkirk and Winnipeg cost $20, while a discount rate (Seniors/55+) cost $18. Children six and under rode free.

On August 20, 2019 Kasper announced that their Winnipeg-Selkirk commuter bus service would be permanently discontinued as they could not make a profit from the few (22 passengers / day) that used the service. Kasper said that they lost C$2,000–3,000 per month and that they needed more than 40 passengers per day to break even.
