= Transit mall =

Urban street reserved for public transit, bicycles, and pedestrians

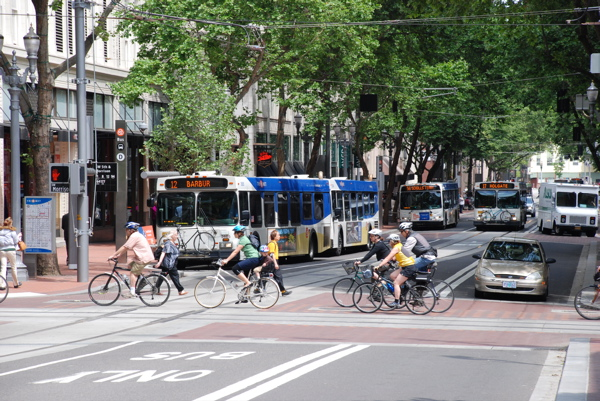
The transit mall in Portland, Oregon.

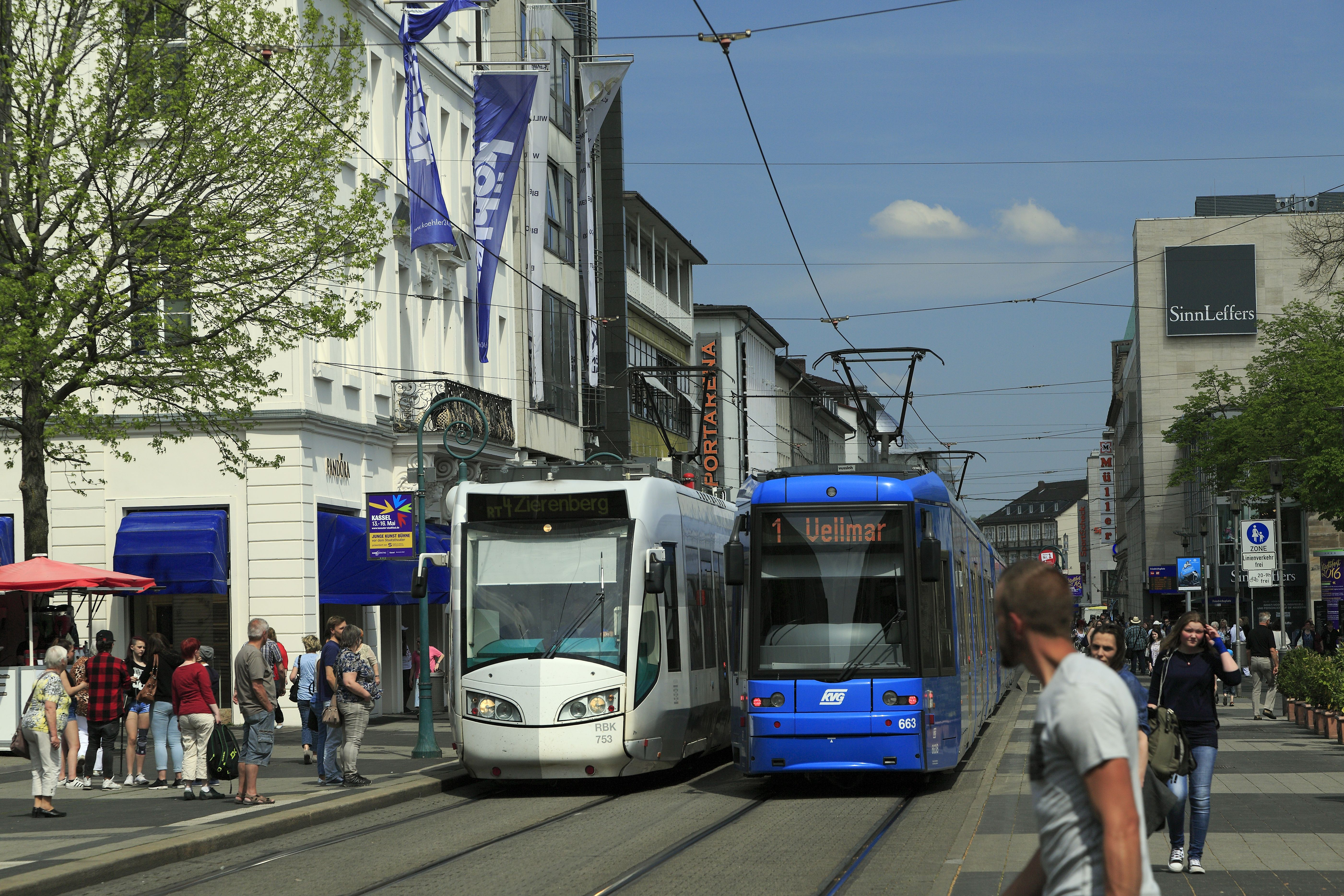
Transit mall in Kassel.

A transit mall is a street, or set of streets, in a city or town along which automobile traffic is prohibited or greatly restricted and only public transit vehicles, bicycles, and pedestrians, and emergency services are permitted.

Transit malls are instituted by communities who feel that it is desirable to have areas not dominated by the automobile, or as a way to speed travel time through an area—usually the city center—for transit vehicles and as a transport hub for interchanges, making them more efficient and thereby more attractive as an alternative to car use. Converting a street or an area to a transit mall can be a form of pedestrianization, allowing pedestrians and cyclists as well as transit vehicles to move more freely, unimpeded by private motor traffic, if autos are banned completely. However, some transit malls are not auto-free, but rather restrict cars and other private traffic to only short segments or only one lane, with other lanes being limited to buses or trams (streetcars).

Transit malls differ from busways, which are roadways dedicated to the movement of buses at high speed or capacity.

== Europe ==
A number of European towns and cities have made part or all of their areas car-free while permitting public transit vehicles. These are often accompanied by car parks on the edge of the area and/or park-and-ride schemes. Most of these zones allow delivery trucks to service the businesses located there during the early morning, and street-cleaning vehicles will usually go through these streets after most shops have closed for the night.

Examples include:

- Leidsestraat, Amsterdam
- Gothenburg, Sweden
- Princes Street in Edinburgh, Scotland
- Queen Street in Oxford, England
- Abingdon/Church Street in Blackpool, England

== North America ==
In North America, the creation of pedestrian-friendly urban environments is still in its infancy, but transit malls have existed in a few cities for more than 40 years, starting with the Nicollet Mall in Minneapolis, Minnesota in 1968, followed by the Granville Mall in Vancouver, British Columbia, in 1974 and the Portland Mall in 1977. In North America, transit malls usually take the form of single streets in which automobiles are mostly prohibited but transit vehicles are allowed. They are rarely completely free of motor vehicles. Often, all of the cross streets are open to motorized traffic, and in some cases taxis are allowed and truck deliveries are made by night.

Examples include:

- King Street Transit Priority Corridor in Toronto, Ontario
- Bryan–Pacific Transit Mall in Dallas, TX
- Nicollet Mall in Minneapolis, Minnesota
- Washington Avenue Mall in Minneapolis, Minnesota
- Granville Mall in Vancouver, British Columbia
- Portland Transit Mall in Portland, Oregon
- 7th Avenue in Calgary, Alberta
- 10th Street NW, Federal Triangle, Washington, DC, de facto
- 16th Street Mall in Denver, Colorado
- Fulton Mall in Brooklyn, New York
- Graham Avenue Transit Mall in Winnipeg, Manitoba
- Long Beach Transit Mall in Los Angeles County
- Main Street Mall in Memphis, Tennessee
- Santa Rosa Transit Mall in Santa Rosa, California
- State Street in Madison, Wisconsin
- Transit Plaza in Champaign, Illinois
- Sundance Square Plaza (Main Street between 3rd & 4th Streets) in Fort Worth, Texas
- The former Chestnut Street Busway in Philadelphia.
- 1st and 2nd Streets in San Jose, California
- Main Street in Buffalo, New York
- C Street in San Diego, California

== Australia ==
Examples include:

- Bourke Street Mall in the Melbourne central business district
- City Interchange in the Canberra central business district
- Hobart Bus Mall in the Hobart central business district
- Swanston Street in the Melbourne central district

== Asia ==
Examples include:

- Jungang-daero Transit Mall, Daegu, South Korea (Daegu Station Junction - Banwoldang Junction)
- Sinchon Transit Mall in Seoul, South Korea
- Jaffa Road, Jerusalem in Israel.
- Discovery Bay, Lantau and Park Island, Ma Wan in New Territories, Hong Kong.

== See also ==
- Car-free days
- List of car-free places
- Carfree city – Urban area absent of motor vehicles
- Esplanade
- Health impact of light rail systems
- Low-emission zone – Area established to improve air quality
- Mall
- Pedestrian zone – Urban car-free area reserved for pedestrian use
- Principles of Intelligent Urbanism – Theory of urban planning
- Street hierarchy – Urban planning restricting through traffic of automobiles
- Transit desert – Area lacking in transit
