= Manitoba Transit Heritage Association =

Non-profit organisation in Manitoba, Canada

- Current logo designed by Ron Zaballero while studying under Prof. Al Guzzi at Red River College in 2010
- Formation: July 21, 1989; 37 years ago
- Type: Nonprofit
- Registration no.: 88775 1659 RR0001
- Legal status: museum and charitable organization
- Location: Winnipeg, Manitoba, Canada
- Website: mtha.ca

The Manitoba Transit Heritage Association Inc. (MTHA) is a non-profit tax charitable organization whose members volunteer in the restoration, maintenance and display of Manitoba’s largest collection of vintage transit vehicles.

The mission of the Association is to restore old transit vehicles for historic purposes; to create a transit museum for display of transit vehicles and related transit-industry memorabilia; and to provide restored transit vehicles for public parades and community event displays.

The MTHA has a fleet of operational historic vehicles, and further vehicles which are awaiting restoration. These buses were previously used in public transportation service (both public and private companies) between 1937 and 2019.

== History ==
The genesis for MTHA was a search in summer 1987 by retired Winnipeg Transit employees Ron Alexander and John Kapusta for old Studebaker automobiles in rural Manitoba. During that search, they found an old electric streetcar in a farm field, and were inspired to found a preservation group for bus, streetcar, and trolleys in Manitoba along with other current and retired Transit employees on July 21, 1989. The group's charter was "restoring old transit vehicles for historical purposes; creating a transit museum for the display of vintage transit vehicles; [providing] restored vehicles to transport senior citizens, disabled persons, school children and other such groups for tours and outings; and [providing] restored transit vehicles for public parades and displays".

== Historic collection ==
=== Buses ===
The group's first restoration project was the 1941 Twin Coach 30GS, which had been abandoned in a farm yard in Grand Marais; it was purchased by MTHA for one dollar. The second project was the 1937 Twin Coach 23R, which was in the yard of King's Welding of Ladywood; it was acquired by MTHA in October 1990 and the restored vehicle was unveiled on November 2, 1991. Also in 1990, the group began restoring the 1946 Ford 69B; although work was substantially complete by 1992, it was not fully operational until 2018 due to other projects.

As of 2019, the 1979 OBI Orion I is intended to serve as a mobile transit museum. MTHA's vehicles have appeared in several television shows and movies filmed in Manitoba, including Less Than Kind and The Don Cherry Story.

Manitoba Transit Heritage Association fleet
Year	Image	Manufacturer	Model	S/N	Agency	Fleet No.	Notes
1937		Twin Coach	23R	95582	Winnipeg Electric Company	#111	Found at Ladywood, MB; acquired in 1990 for $750.
1936		Dodge/Lawrie		4024R9	Winnipeg Electric Company	#501	Unrestored
1941		Twin Coach	30GS	108770	Winnipeg Electric Company	#214	Found at Grand Marais, MB
1946		Ford Transit	69B	66116X	Winnipeg Electric Company	#565	Found at Fisher Branch, MB
1948		CCF/Brill	C-36	CCB-CD36-47-2329	Winnipeg Electric Company	#707	Unrestored
1950		CCF/Brill	T-48A	8151	Winnipeg Electric Company	#1768	Last electric trolley coach to operate in revenue service (Oct 30, 1970).
1954		GMC	TDH-4801	TDH4801-249	Los Angeles Metropolitan Transit Authority	#6583	Representative of several "Old Look" types previously operated in Winnipeg. Donated in 2016.
1954		GMC	TDH-4801	TDH4801-249	Sacramento Regional Transit District		Representative of several "Old Look" types previously operated in Winnipeg. Donated in 2016.
1954		GMC	TDH-4801	TDH4801-249	BC Transit		Representative of several "Old Look" types previously operated in Winnipeg. Donated in 2016.
1954		GMC	TDH-4801	TDH4801-249	Regina Transit	#200	Representative of several "Old Look" types previously operated in Winnipeg. Donated in 2016.
1954		GMC	TDH-4801	TDH4801-249	Metropolitan Corporation of Greater Winnipeg	#188	Representative of several "Old Look" types previously operated in Winnipeg. Donated in 2016.
1956		Western Flyer	T-36-2L	MBPGSIN6458	Grey Goose Bus Lines	#20	AKA Scenic Cruiser, donated in fully-restored condition in 2009 by New Flyer.
1958		Western Flyer	T-40	RD115412	Royal Canadian Air Force	#119A35-1815	Donated in fully-restored condition in 2009 by New Flyer.
1963		GMC	SDM-4502	C006	Beaver Bus Lines	#33	Donated in 2009.
1966		Western Flyer	Canuck P-41	3966	Canadian Coachways	#42	
1971		GMC	T6H-4521A	T6H4521814	Metropolitan Corporation of Greater Winnipeg	#751 (ex-#132)	Donated to MTHA in 2000.
1979		Orion Bus Industries	Orion 01.503	90810167	Beaver Bus Lines	#43	Donated by Vintage Railway Society; assigned Fleet No. 953/963, used as "Rolling Museum Bus".
1984		Flyer Industries	D901-10240	D102403025	Winnipeg Transit	#107	Donated in 2009. First Flyer bus in the MTHA fleet.
1984		Motor Coach Industries	MC-9	1M89CM6A9DP038668	Northern Bus Lines	#112	Donated by Northern Bus Lines in 2015.
1988		Motor Coach Industries	TC40-102N Classic		Winnipeg Transit	#316	
1990		New Flyer	D40		Winnipeg Transit	#858	
2002		New Flyer	D40i		Winnipeg Transit	#907	

=== Artifacts ===
In addition to historic vehicles, the MTHA has a large collection of related transit-industry memorabilia such as badges, uniforms, passes, tickets, transfers, transfer punches, fareboxes, decals and manuals.
