= Norman D. Wilson (engineer) =

Transportation Engineer

Norman Douglas Wilson (1884–1967) was a Toronto-based transportation engineer who designed the Toronto subway, and created a design of a subway for Winnipeg in the late 1950s.

== See also ==
- Wilson Avenue – a street in Toronto named for him
- Wilson (TTC) - a subway station on the above-mentioned street
- Wilson Heights, Toronto - a neighbourhood near the above-mentioned street
- Wilson Heights (electoral district) - named for the above mention neighbourhood
