= Henry McKenney =

Henry McKenney may refer to:

- Henry McKenney (merchant) (c. 1826–1886), merchant from Amherstburg, Upper Canada
- Henry William McKenney (1848–1921), politician from Alberta, Canada
- Henry Patrick McKenney (1863–1942), American woodsman, lumberman, outdoor enthusiast, and businessman
