= Pembina (Alberta provincial electoral district) =

Defunct provincial electoral district in Alberta, Canada

Alberta electoral district

Defunct provincial electoral district
- Legislature: Legislative Assembly of Alberta
- District created: 1909
- District abolished: 1971
- First contested: 1909
- Last contested: 1967

Pembina was a provincial electoral district in Alberta, Canada, mandated to return a single member to the Legislative Assembly of Alberta from 1909 to 1971.

== History ==
The Pembina electoral district was formed before the 1909 Alberta general election from the western portion of the St. Albert electoral district.

From 1924 to 1956, the district used instant-runoff voting to elect its MLA.

The district was abolished before the 1971 Alberta general election, and was subsequently incorporated into Barrhead and Athabasca.

=== Members of the Legislative Assembly (MLAs) ===
Members of the Legislative Assembly for Pembina
Assembly	Years	Member	Party
2nd	1909–1913	Henry William McKenney	Liberal
3rd	1913–1917	Gordon MacDonald	Liberal
4th	1917–1921	Gordon MacDonald	Liberal
5th	1921–1926	George MacLachlan	United Farmers
6th	1926–1930	George MacLachlan	United Farmers
7th	1930–1935	George MacLachlan	United Farmers
8th	1935–1940	Harry Knowlton Brown	Social Credit
9th	1940–1944	George MacLachlan	Independent
10th	1944–1948	Robin Jorgenson	Social Credit
11th	1948–1952	Robin Jorgenson	Social Credit
12th	1952–1955	Robin Jorgenson	Social Credit
13th	1955–1959	Robin Jorgenson	Social Credit
14th	1959–1963	Robin Jorgenson	Social Credit
15th	1963–1967	Robin Jorgenson	Social Credit
16th	1967–1971	Carl A. Muller	Social Credit
See Barrhead electoral district from 1971-1993 and Athabasca electoral district from 1971-1986

== Election results ==
=== 1909 ===
1909 Alberta general election
Party	Candidate	Votes	%	±%
Liberal	Henry William McKenney	Acclaimed	–	–
Total		N/A	–	–
Rejected, spoiled and declined		N/A	–	–
Eligible electors / turnout		N/A	N/A	–
Liberal pickup new district.				
Source(s) Source: "Pembina Official Results 1909 Alberta general election". Alberta Heritage Community Foundation.

=== 1913 ===
1913 Alberta general election
Party	Candidate	Votes	%	±%
Liberal	Gordon Macdonald	432	50.64%	–
Conservative	F. D. Armitage	421	49.36%	–
Total		853	–	–
Rejected, spoiled and declined		N/A	–	–
Eligible electors / turnout		N/A	N/A	–
Liberal hold		Swing		N/A
Source(s) Source: "Pembina Official Results 1913 Alberta general election". Alberta Heritage Community Foundation.

=== 1917 ===
1917 Alberta general election
Party	Candidate	Votes	%	±%
Liberal	Gordon Macdonald	Acclaimed	–	–
Total		N/A	–	–
Rejected, spoiled and declined		N/A	–	–
Eligible electors / turnout		N/A	N/A	–
Liberal hold		Swing		N/A
Source(s) Source: "Hand Hills Official Results 1917 Alberta general election". Alberta Heritage Community Foundation. One of eleven Members of the Legislative Assembly of Alberta acclaimed under The Elections Act Section 38, which stipulated that any member of the 3rd Alberta Legislative Assembly would be guaranteed re-election, with no contest held, if the member joined for wartime service in the First World War. An Act amending The Election Act respecting Members of the Legislative Assembly on Active Service., SA 1917, c. 38

=== 1921 ===
1921 Alberta general election
Party	Candidate	Votes	%	±%
United Farmers	George MacLachlan	1,838	72.85%	–
Liberal	Dr. Phillips	540	21.40%	–
Independent	F. D. Armitage	145	5.75%	–
Total		2,523	–	–
Rejected, spoiled and declined		N/A	–	–
Eligible electors / turnout		N/A	N/A	–
United Farmers gain from Liberal		Swing		N/A
Source(s) Source: "Pembina Official Results 1921 Alberta general election". Alberta Heritage Community Foundation.

=== 1926 ===
1926 Alberta general election
Party	Candidate	Votes	%	±%
United Farmers	George MacLachlan	1,930	59.51%	-13.34%
Liberal	E. F. Henderson	886	27.32%	5.92%
Conservative	A. D. Henderson	427	13.17%	–
Total		3,243	–	–
Rejected, spoiled and declined		153	–	–
Eligible electors / turnout		4,521	75.12%	–
United Farmers hold		Swing		-9.63%
Source(s) Source: "Pembina Official Results 1926 Alberta general election". Alberta Heritage Community Foundation.

=== 1930 ===
1930 Alberta general election
Party	Candidate	Votes	%	±%
United Farmers	George MacLachlan	2,094	64.35%	4.84%
Independent	H. G. Curlett	1,160	35.65%	–
Total		3,254	–	–
Rejected, spoiled and declined		120	–	–
Eligible electors / turnout		4,982	67.72%	-7.39%
United Farmers hold		Swing		-1.74%
Source(s) Source: "Pembina Official Results 1930 Alberta general election". Alberta Heritage Community Foundation.

=== 1935 ===
1935 Alberta general election
Party	Candidate	Votes	%	±%
Social Credit	Harry Knowlton Brown	3,133	57.06%	–
Liberal	H. B. Fraser	1,145	20.85%	–
United Farmers	George MacLachlan	1,030	18.76%	-45.59%
Conservative	M. G. H. Cardann	183	3.33%	–
Total		5,491	–	–
Rejected, spoiled and declined		227	–	–
Eligible electors / turnout		7,140	80.08%	12.36%
Social Credit gain from United Farmers		Swing		3.75%
Source(s) Source: "Pembina Official Results 1935 Alberta general election". Alberta Heritage Community Foundation.

=== 1940 ===
1940 Alberta general election
Party	Candidate	Votes	%	±%
First count
Independent	George MacLachlan	1,719	42.43%	–
Social Credit	Harry Knowlton Brown	1,589	39.22%	-17.84%
Co-operative Commonwealth	W. Mentz	743	18.34%	–
Total		4,051	–	–
Ballot transfer results
Independent	George MacLachlan	1,980	52.13%	–
Social Credit	Harry Knowlton Brown	1,818	47.87%	–
Total		3,798	–	–
Rejected, spoiled and declined		244	–	–
Eligible electors / turnout		7,152	60.05%	-20.03%
Independent gain from Social Credit		Swing		-2.00%
Source(s) Source: "Pembina Official Results 1940 Alberta general election". Alberta Heritage Community Foundation. Instant-runoff voting requires a candidate to receive a plurality (greater than 50%) of the votes. As no candidate received a plurality of votes, the bottom candidate was eliminated and their 2nd place votes were applied to both other candidates until one received a plurality.

=== 1944 ===
1944 Alberta general election
Party	Candidate	Votes	%	±%
Social Credit	Robin Jorgenson	2,400	50.87%	11.65%
Co-operative Commonwealth	Chas. P. Paterson	1,498	31.75%	13.41%
Independent	George MacLachlan	820	17.38%	-25.05%
Total		4,718	–	–
Rejected, spoiled and declined		242	–	–
Eligible electors / turnout		6,962	71.24%	-20.03%
Social Credit gain from Independent		Swing		7.70%
Source(s) Source: "Pembina Official Results 1944 Alberta general election". Alberta Heritage Community Foundation.

=== 1948 ===
1948 Alberta general election
Party	Candidate	Votes	%	±%
Social Credit	Robin Jorgenson	3,165	59.59%	8.72%
Co-operative Commonwealth	Martin Fjelstad	1,462	27.53%	-4.22%
Liberal	E. W. Munsterman	684	12.88%	–
Total		5,311	–	–
Rejected, spoiled and declined		386	–	–
Eligible electors / turnout		7,829	72.77%	1.52%
Social Credit hold		Swing		6.47%
Source(s) Source: "Pembina Official Results 1948 Alberta general election". Alberta Heritage Community Foundation.

=== 1952 ===
1952 Alberta general election
Party	Candidate	Votes	%	±%
Social Credit	Robin Jorgenson	2,818	57.67%	-1.92%
Liberal	Matthew M. Watt	1,127	23.07%	10.19%
Co-operative Commonwealth	William H. Roberts	941	19.26%	-8.27%
Total		4,886	–	–
Rejected, spoiled and declined		379	–	–
Eligible electors / turnout		7,577	69.49%	-3.28%
Social Credit hold		Swing		1.27%
Source(s) Source: "Pembina Official Results 1952 Alberta general election". Alberta Heritage Community Foundation.

=== 1955 ===
1955 Alberta general election
Party	Candidate	Votes	%	±%
Social Credit	Robin Jorgenson	2,609	50.59%	-7.08%
Liberal	George Schultz	1,708	33.12%	10.05%
Co-operative Commonwealth	Martin Felstad	840	16.29%	-2.97%
Total		5,157	–	–
Rejected, spoiled and declined		465	–	–
Eligible electors / turnout		7,715	72.87%	3.38%
Social Credit hold		Swing		-8.57%
Source(s) Source: "Pembina Official Results 1955 Alberta general election". Alberta Heritage Community Foundation.

=== 1959 ===
1959 Alberta general election
Party	Candidate	Votes	%	±%
Social Credit	Robin Jorgenson	3,436	61.80%	11.21%
Progressive Conservative	Frie Bredo	1,708	30.72%	–
Liberal	Gustav Wahl	416	7.48%	-25.64%
Total		5,560	–	–
Rejected, spoiled and declined		27	–	–
Eligible electors / turnout		7,693	72.62%	-0.25%
Social Credit hold		Swing		6.80%
Source(s) Source: "Pembina Official Results 1959 Alberta general election". Alberta Heritage Community Foundation.

=== 1963 ===
1963 Alberta general election
Party	Candidate	Votes	%	±%
Social Credit	Robin Jorgenson	3,067	56.18%	-5.62%
Liberal	Dr. Ray Brodeur	842	15.42%	7.94%
Progressive Conservative	Percy Baxandall	823	15.08%	-15.64%
New Democratic	Herman Hauch	562	10.29%	–
Independent Social Credit	Verdun Baxandall	165	3.02%	–
Total		5,459	–	–
Rejected, spoiled and declined		39	–	–
Eligible electors / turnout		8,850	62.12%	-10.50%
Social Credit hold		Swing		4.84%
Source(s) Source: "Pembina Official Results 1963 Alberta general election". Alberta Heritage Community Foundation.

=== 1967 ===
1967 Alberta general election
Party	Candidate	Votes	%	±%
Social Credit	Carl A. Muller	2,866	49.46%	-6.73%
Progressive Conservative	Edward G. Samuel	2,098	36.20%	21.13%
New Democratic	George A. E. Garnett	576	9.94%	-0.36%
Liberal	Edward P. MacCallum	255	4.40%	-11.02%
Total		5,795	–	–
Rejected, spoiled and declined		273	–	–
Eligible electors / turnout		8,945	67.84%	5.71%
Social Credit hold		Swing		-13.75%
Source(s) Source: "Pembina Official Results 1967 Alberta general election". Alberta Heritage Community Foundation.

== Plebiscite results ==
=== 1957 liquor plebiscite ===
1957 Alberta liquor plebiscite results: Pembina
Question A: Do you approve additional types of outlets for the sale of beer, wine and spirituous liquor subject to a local vote?
Ballot choice	Votes	%
Yes	1,375	52.12%
No	1,263	47.88%
Total votes	2,638	100%
Rejected, spoiled and declined	75	
7,240 eligible electors, turnout 37.47%

On October 30, 1957, a stand-alone plebiscite was held province wide in all 50 of the then current provincial electoral districts in Alberta. The government decided to consult Alberta voters to decide on liquor sales and mixed drinking after a divisive debate in the legislature. The plebiscite was intended to deal with the growing demand for reforming antiquated liquor control laws.

The plebiscite was conducted in two parts. Question A, asked in all districts, asked the voters if the sale of liquor should be expanded in Alberta, while Question B, asked in a handful of districts within the corporate limits of Calgary and Edmonton, asked if men and women should be allowed to drink together in establishments.

Province wide Question A of the plebiscite passed in 33 of the 50 districts while Question B passed in all five districts. Pembina voted in favour of the proposal by a narrow margin. Voter turnout in the district was poor, as it fell significantly below the province wide average of 46%.

Official district returns were released to the public on December 31, 1957. The Social Credit government in power at the time did not consider the results binding. However the results of the vote led the government to repeal all existing liquor legislation and introduce an entirely new Liquor Act.

Municipal districts lying inside electoral districts that voted against the plebiscite were designated Local Option Zones by the Alberta Liquor Control Board and considered effective dry zones. Business owners who wanted a licence had to petition for a binding municipal plebiscite in order to be granted a licence.

== See also ==
- List of Alberta provincial electoral districts
- Canadian provincial electoral districts
