= Clearwater (provincial electoral district) =

Defunct provincial electoral district in Alberta, Canada

Alberta electoral district

Defunct provincial electoral district
- Legislature: Legislative Assembly of Alberta
- District created: 1913
- District abolished: 1926
- First contested: 1913
- Last contested: 1921

Clearwater was a provincial electoral district in Alberta, Canada, mandated to return a single member to the Legislative Assembly of Alberta using the first past the post method of voting from 1913 to 1926.

== History ==
The district was controversial because it had only 74 enumerated people when it was created under the 1913 redistribution. It was the smallest district in terms of population in Alberta history. After Joseph State died in 1924, the United Farmers government was facing a possible by-election in the district. The government redistributed the riding and dropped the seat from the Assembly. The riding was divided up between Pembina, Lac Ste. Anne, and Peace River.

=== Members of the Legislative Assembly (MLAs) ===
Members of the Legislative Assembly for Clearwater
Assembly	Years	Member	Party
3rd	1913–1917	Henry William McKenney	Liberal
4th	1917–1921	Joseph State	Liberal
5th	1921–1926	Joseph State	Liberal
See Pembina electoral district from 1909-1971; Lac Ste. Anne electoral district from 1909-1971 and Peace River electoral district from 1926-1971

== Election results ==
=== 1913 ===
1913 Alberta general election
Party	Candidate	Votes	%
Liberal	Henry William McKenney	40	38.83%
Conservative	A. Williamson Taylor	39	37.86%
Socialist	Joseph Andrew Clarke	24	23.30%
Total		103	–
Source(s) Source: "Clearwater Official Results 1913 Alberta general election". Alberta Heritage Community Foundation.

=== 1917 ===
1917 Alberta general election
Party	Candidate	Votes	%	±%
Liberal	Joseph State	188	64.38%	25.55%
Conservative	R. M. Frith	104	35.62%	-2.25%
Total		292	–	–
Rejected, spoiled and declined		N/A	–	–
Eligible electors / turnout		407	71.74%	–
Liberal hold		Swing		13.90%
Source(s) Source: "Clearwater Official Results 1917 Alberta general election". Alberta Heritage Community Foundation.

=== 1921 ===
1921 Alberta general election
Party	Candidate	Votes	%	±%
Liberal	Joseph State	234	41.94%	-22.45%
Liberal	O. T. Lee	147	26.34%	-38.04%
Independent	R. G. Campbell	117	20.97%	–
Independent	S. W. Chambers	60	10.75%	–
Total		558	–	–
Rejected, spoiled and declined		N/A	–	–
Eligible electors / turnout		709	78.70%	+6.96%
Liberal hold		Swing		-6.59%
Source(s) Source: "Clearwater Official Results 1921 Alberta general election". Alberta Heritage Community Foundation.

== See also ==
- List of Alberta provincial electoral districts
- Canadian provincial electoral districts
- Rotten and pocket boroughs
