= Portage and Main =

Intersection in downtown Winnipeg

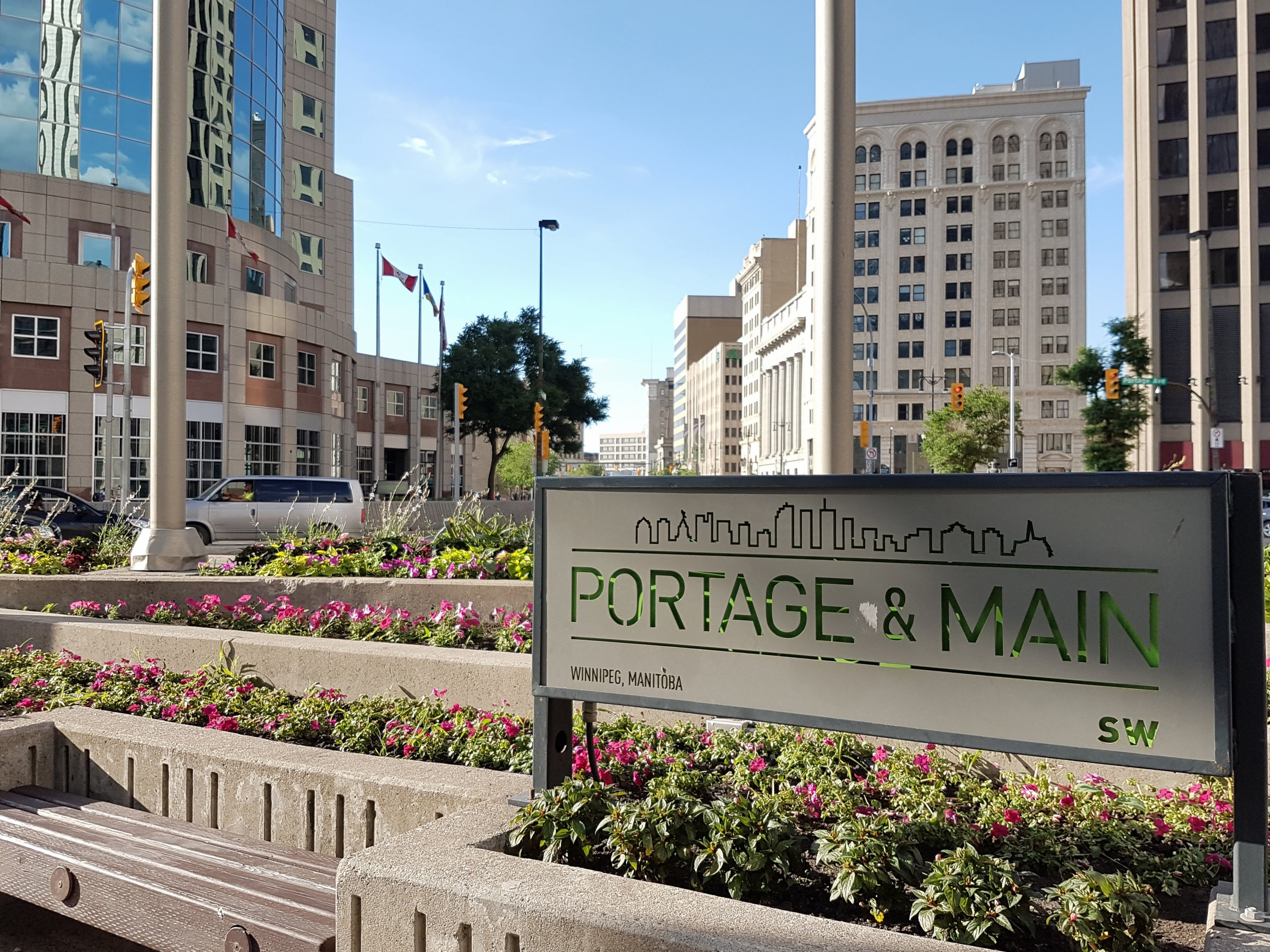
- Interactive map of Portage and Main

Location
- Winnipeg, Manitoba, Canada
- Coordinates: 49.89545°N 97.13838°W
- Roads at junction: Route 52 (Main Street); Route 85 (Portage Avenue); Route 57; YH

Construction
- Type: at-grade intersection
- Opened: June 2, 1862
- Maintained by: City of Winnipeg Public Works

Portage and Main is an intersection in downtown Winnipeg, Manitoba, Canada, located where Portage Avenue (Route 85) and Main Street (Route 52) intersect. The corner is known as the "crossroads of Canada", due to its relative proximity to the longitudinal centre of Canada.

Formally, Portage & Main is a designated neighbourhood including the blocks immediately surrounding the intersection, within the larger Fort Rouge–East Fort Garry city ward.

== History ==
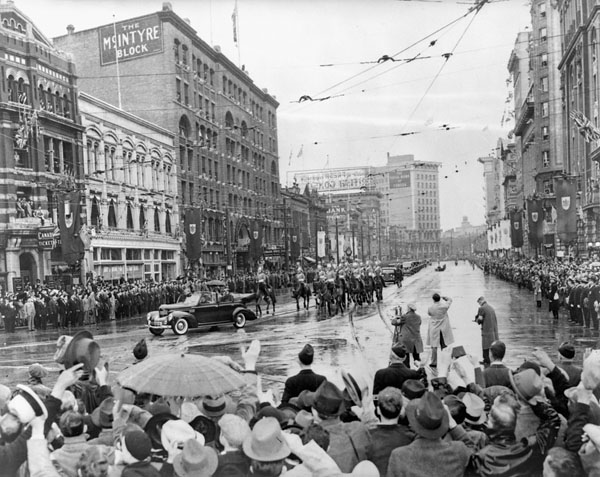
King George VI and Queen Elizabeth are greeted by crowds at Portage and Main, 1939 (view looking north)

The land upon which Portage and Main sits was originally purchased by Henry McKenney on 2 June 1862. He chose land where the north-south and east-west ox cart paths crossed, in order to build a general store with his half-brother John Christian Schultz.

Portage and Main is now the hub of some of Winnipeg's main transportation routes. It was once the centre for the banking industry in Western Canada. The national banks have branches accessible from beneath Portage and Main. It has served as a temporary city square and meeting place for parades and events, including the Winnipeg General Strike of 1919.

In 1974, the intersection was featured on an 8-cent stamp commemorating Winnipeg's centennial.

Concrete relief by Bruce Head, taken from underground concourse, facing north.

In 1976, the City of Winnipeg signed an agreement with private developers to open an underground concourse linking shopping malls under the four corner properties. This included a long-term deal to close the pedestrian crossings at the intersection, with street works completed around 1978. The concourse and walkways are connected through the Winnipeg Skywalk. The Portage and Main Circus houses a large concrete sculptural wall created by Winnipeg artist Bruce Head.

On 13 August 1981, Portage and Main was the place where Dale Hawerchuk signed his contract with the Winnipeg Jets and later was the location of the "Save the Jets" rallies in 1995 and 1996.

In 2016, with the deal to close the intersection set to expire, city officials were contemplating reopening the intersection to pedestrians. In a non-binding plebiscite in 2018, 65 percent of voters voted in favour of keeping the intersection closed to pedestrians, with many concerned about traffic congestion. The mayor agreed to accept the results of that plebiscite.

In March 2024, following a city report that estimated repairs to the underground concourse would cost more than $73 million and cause four to five years of construction disruption, Winnipeg city council voted 11–3 to reopen the intersection to pedestrians by 2025. The barriers were removed and street-level crossings reopened on 27 June 2025.

More recently, Portage and Main has served as an anchor point for occasional street festivals and the winter lighting of holiday street decorations. The annual Winnipeg Santa Claus Parade regularly starts at Portage and Main and proceeds west down Portage Avenue, and the tradition of coordinated Christmas lights downtown along sections of Main Street and Portage Avenue dates back to 1929.

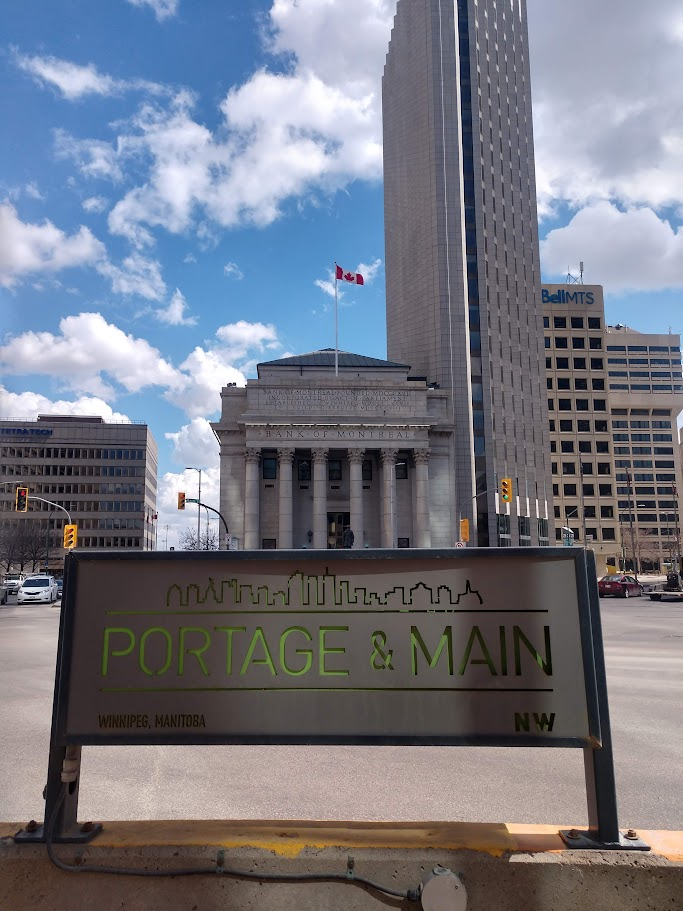
Portage and Main facing the Bank of Montreal Building now owned by the Manitoba Metis Federation

== Buildings ==
Portage and Main is the site several significant buildings:

- 201 Portage
- Richardson Building
- 360 Main
- Winnipeg Square
- Fairmont Hotel

== Cultural references ==
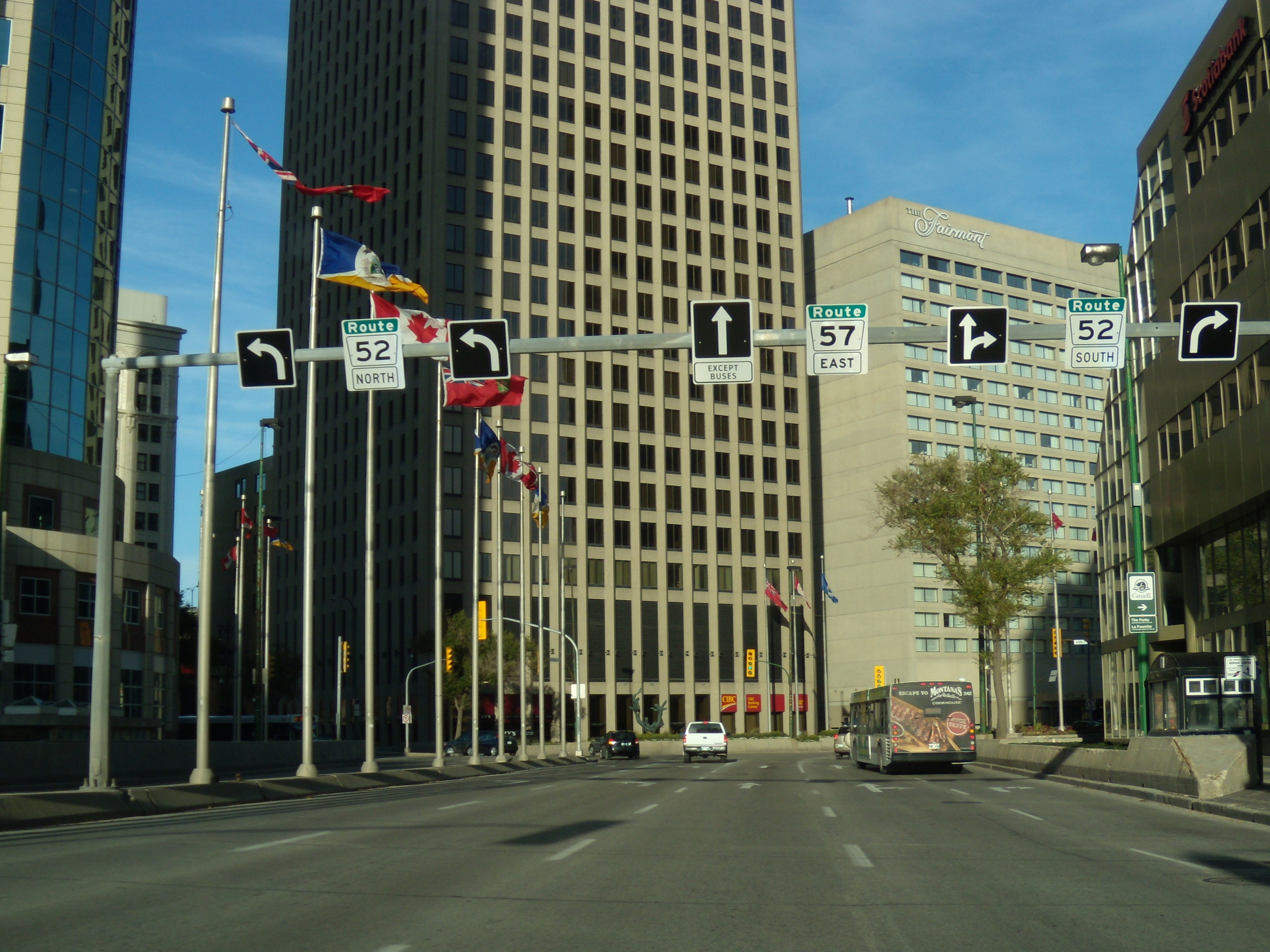
Portage and Main as seen from Portage Ave Eastbound

There are numerous cultural references to the intersection, including the 1992 Randy Bachman and Neil Young song "Prairie Town", with the chorus repeating the line "Portage and Main, 50 below." The British band Blurt have a song named "Portage & Main" on their album Kenny Rogers' Greatest Hit. It is also the setting for the Stompin' Tom Connors song "Red River Jane". In his song "Free in the Harbour," Canadian folk singer Stan Rogers referenced Portage and Main as a stop for fishermen from Hermitage Bay, Newfoundland on their way to find oil field work in "the hills of Alberta."

Portage and Main is a property on the Canadian Monopoly board, and was the inspiration for Fort Garry Brewing Company's "Portage and Main" India Pale Ale.
