= Beacon Lodge =

Apartment building in Victoria, British Columbia, Canada

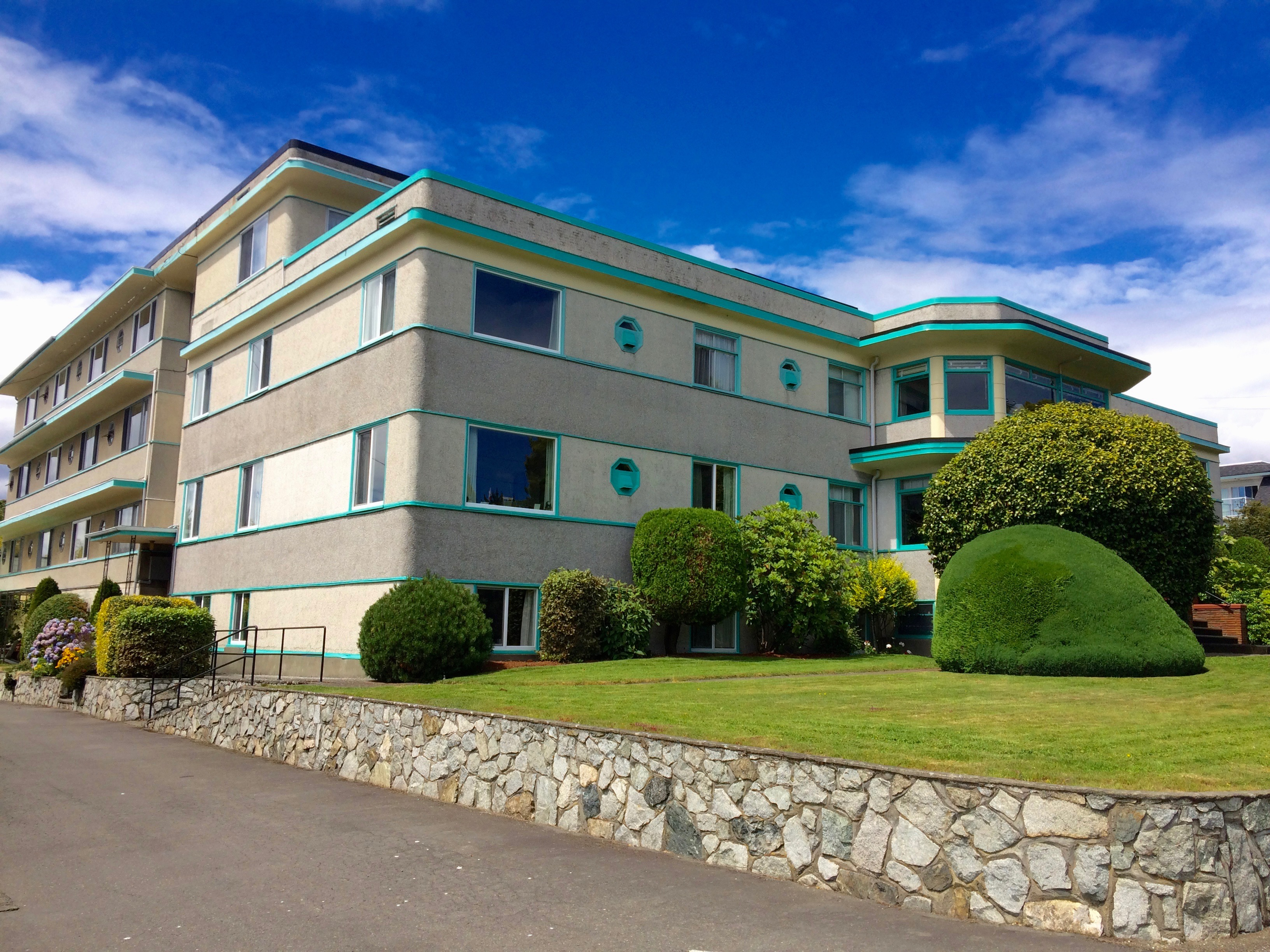
- Beacon Lodge Apartments
- Former names: Beacon Cottage (1883–1945), Tourist Lodge (1946–1949), Beacon Lodge Motel (1949–1973), Beacon Lodge (1973–present)

General information
- Architectural style: Streamline Modern
- Location: Victoria, British Columbia, Canada
- Coordinates: 48.4099°N 123.3694°W
- Opening: September 15, 1949; 77 years ago
- Owner: Bernie Côté and family
- Operator: Cote Enterprises Ltd

Technical details
- Floor count: 4

Design and construction
- Architects: Henri and Joseph Côté

Other information
- Number of suites: 59
- Parking: Street

Website
- http://www.beaconlodgeapartments.com

The Beacon Lodge is an apartment building in Victoria, British Columbia, Canada. Located at 30 Douglas Street, the building is directly across from the start of the Trans-Canada Highway, and just over 200 m south of Beacon Drive-In.

The building has 59 rental units on 4 separate floors, the majority being small bachelor suites and a few one-bedroom apartments. Many suites have views of the Olympic Mountains across the Strait of Juan de Fuca and others overlook Beacon Hill Park.

== History ==
In 1945 Henri Côté and his wife Anne-Marie (Forcade) Côté, along with his parents, Joseph and Ida (Demers) Côté, moved to Victoria from Edmonton, Alberta. Joseph Côté purchased the Beacon Cottage, an old historic building built in 1883. Being contractors by profession, both father and son renovated the building, converting it into a motel and renaming it the Tourist Lodge. They opened for business in 1946.

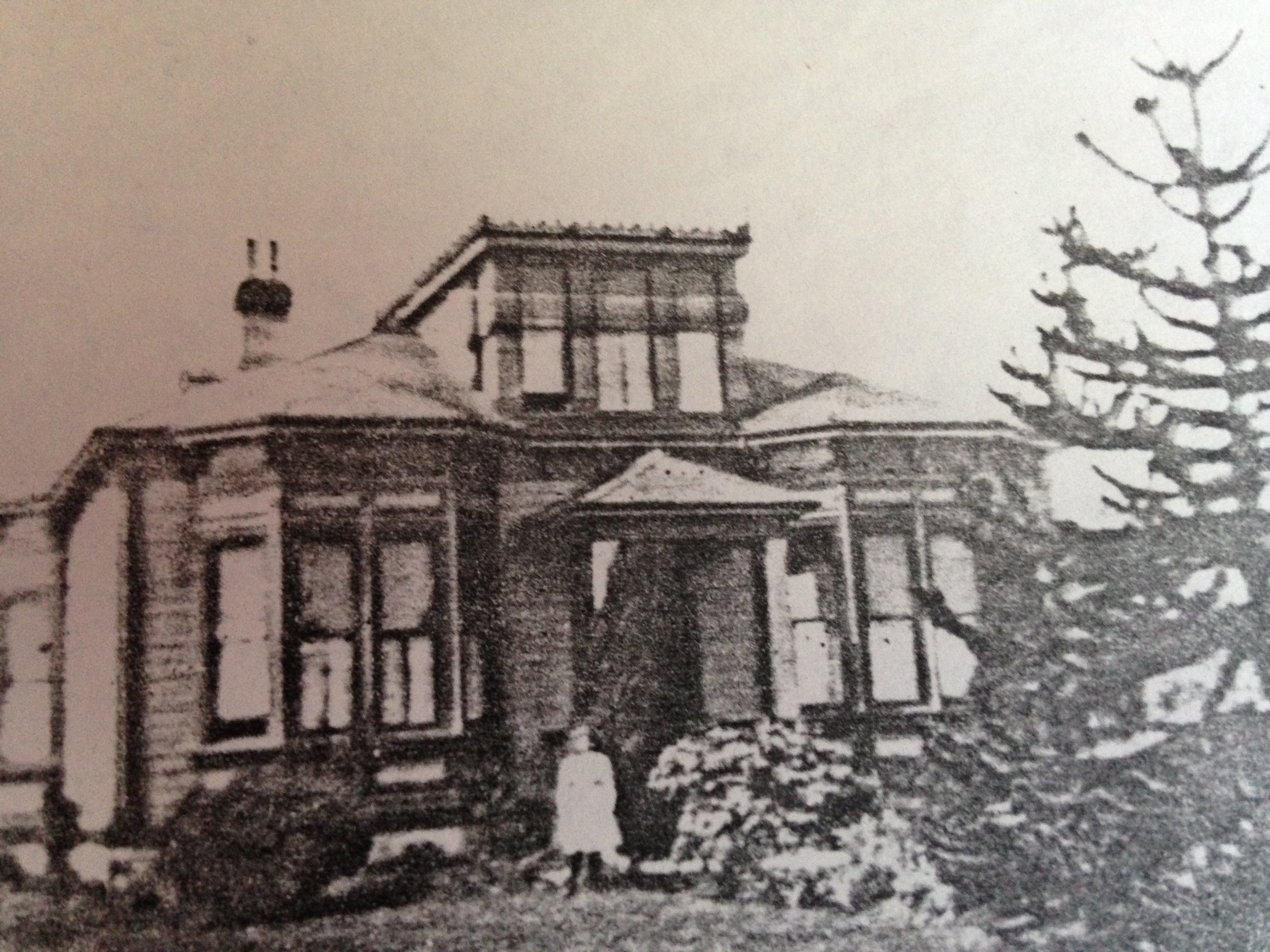
The Beacon Cottage, built in 1883 by Mr. and Mrs. Brown

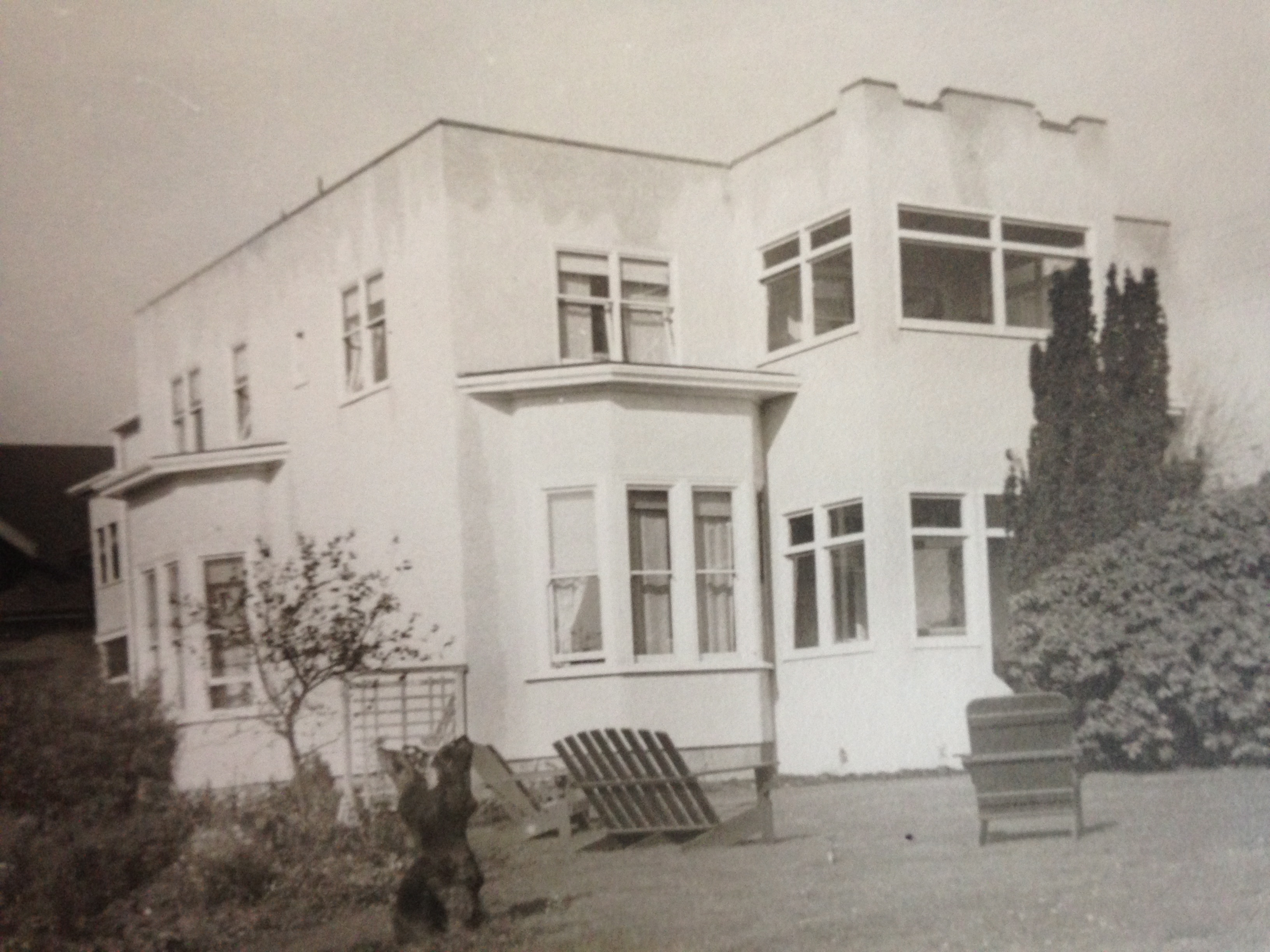
The newly renovated Tourist Lodge, opened for business in 1946

The Tourist Lodge was a haven for many travellers looking for a peaceful retreat, especially those from the Canadian Prairies who wanted a reprieve from the long harsh winters. As the Côtés began to take root in the city, Henri Côté felt it was time to expand the business. Over the course of a year, the Beacon Lodge Motel was constructed. The building was built in front and attached to the existing Tourist Lodge. It officially opened for business on September 15, 1949.

Joseph Côté died suddenly two years later and Cote Enterprises Ltd was established in his honour in 1952. For the next several decades the Beacon Lodge operated as a successful motel, housing hundreds of guests each year. Its Art Deco and Streamline Moderne architecture, both inside and out, made it very trendy for guests during that time. The building included octagonal windows, a signature of Henri Côté, which he used on other projects he helped build in Victoria during that time.

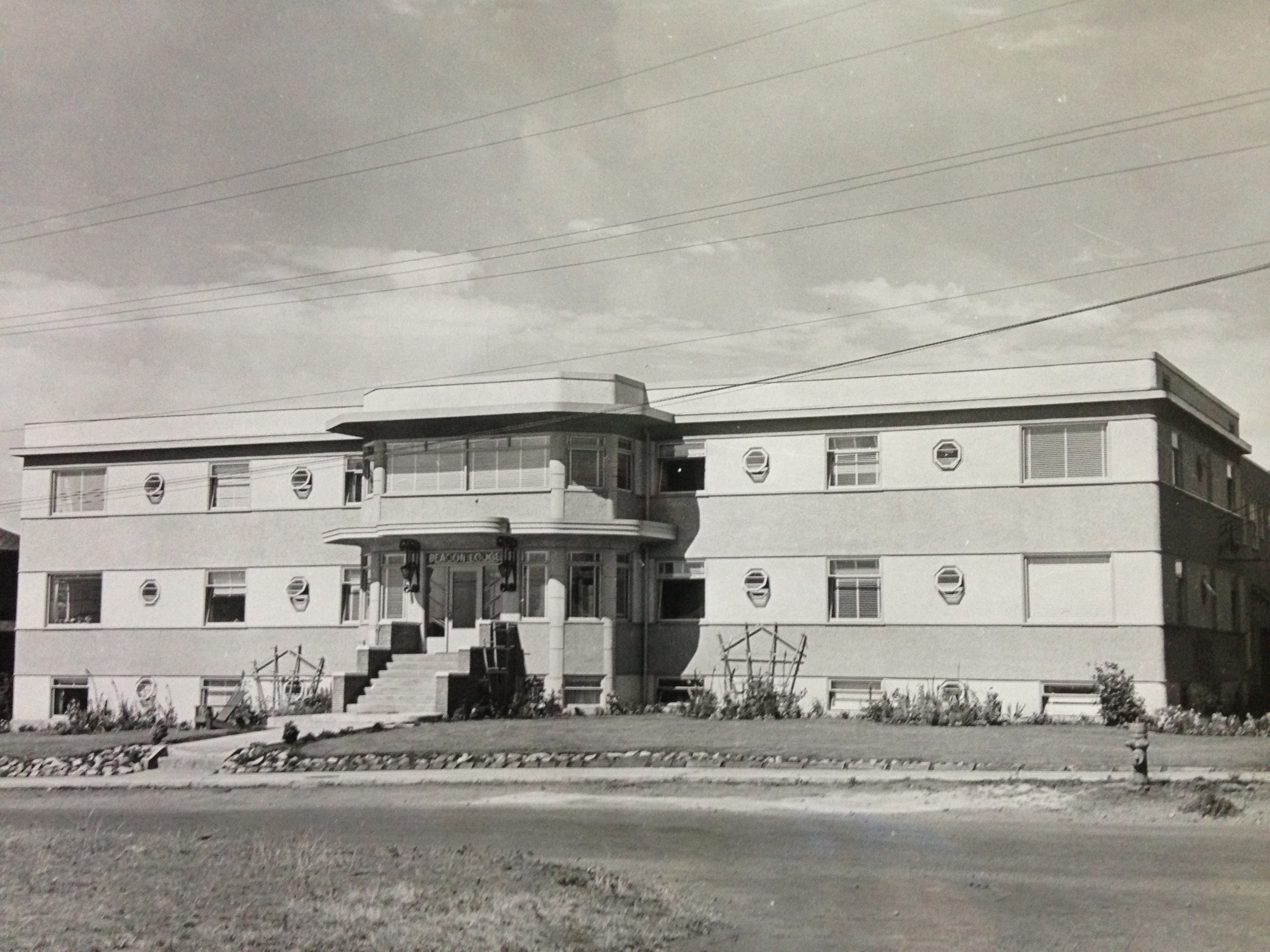
The Beacon Lodge Motel, circa 1949

In 1962, an additional renovation was undertaken under Henri Côté's supervision. A fourth floor was added and an additional wing was built and attached to the southern back part of the Beacon Lodge. This final renovation brought the building up to its current specifications. A miniature replica of Beacon Hill Lighthouse was erected on the northeastern part of the property by Henri Côté. Over the years, the lighthouse became a symbol to the many guests and residents, giving them a sense of home and warmth.

The Beacon Lodge continued to operate as a motel until in the early 1970s when Henri Côté's youngest son, Bernie, joined the family business. Bernie persuaded to have the Lodge operate as an apartment rental instead. Since then, the Beacon Lodge has continued to operate successfully as an apartment building. In 2008, Bernie's two children Tristan and Hilary started working at the Beacon Lodge, becoming the fourth generation to have a hand in the business.

== Charitable foundation ==
In 1977, Henri and Anne-Marie Côté started a non-profit foundation called the Ray Côté Memorial Foundation in memory of their son Raymond who had died of cancer in 1967 at the young age of 28. Their daughter Thérèse was sponsoring a boy in India and gave Henri the idea of a foundation to honour Ray and his altruistic nature.

As a result, the Ray Côté Memorial Foundation was registered as a charity on August 15, 1977. In order to raise funds, a large puzzle was purchased showing two men (who bore an uncanny resemblance to Ray and his brother Robert). Each puzzle piece purchased added $13.33 towards the goal of $10,000, which once achieved be invested and the proceeds distributed to "help alleviate the suffering of the poor". Henri and Marie, along with other immediate family members invested a significant amount and eventually this goal was met. Registered charities were chosen for distribution of the interest earned each year.

In 1987, Raymond's brother Robert died and Henri conceived the idea of changing the name of the foundation to the Côté Family Memorial Foundation. In the years since, Henri as well as Anne-Marie and a third son (Richard) have died.

The Côté Family Memorial Foundation strives primarily to help charities that do not have large budgets to solicit funds. In the 40 years after its inception, the Côté Family Memorial Foundation had successfully donated over $152,000 to the needs of individuals around the world although most of the charities receiving help operate in the Victoria area. The directors discuss the needs of those asking for assistance and try to focus on groups who help individuals to help themselves.

Over the years, the Foundation has grown due to the family members cum directors who have pursued Henri and Anne-Marie's motto that "when much is received, much should be given". In that spirit, the Foundation currently has two of the family's third generation working to ensure its continuity.

== Honours ==
In March 2011 the Government of British Columbia recognized the Côté family for their contributions to the francophone community in Victoria over the course of many decades. Henri Côté's youngest daughter, Thérèse (Côté) Gerein received the honour on behalf of the family. A plaque was issued and placed in front of the Beacon Lodge.

== See also ==
- Franco-Columbian
