= Douglas Street (Victoria, British Columbia) =

Street in Victoria, British Columbia

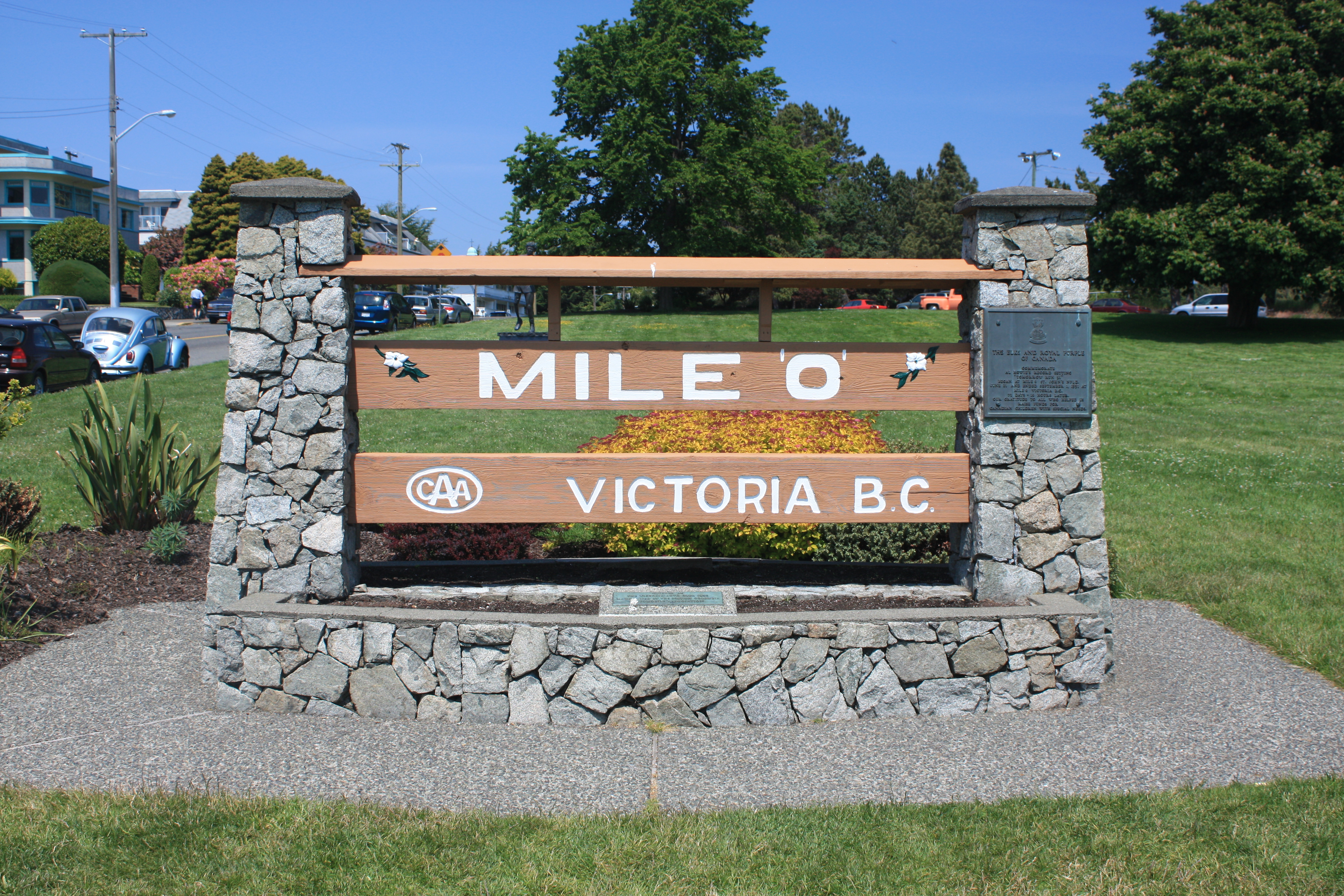
The "Mile 0" sign for the Trans-Canada Highway

Douglas Street is a road in Victoria, British Columbia. It is named after Sir James Douglas, the second Governor of the Colony of Vancouver Island. A segment of the Trans-Canada Highway, the main part of Douglas Street runs approximately five kilometres (3 mi) from Dallas Road on the Georgia Strait to just north of Saanich Road, where the Trans-Canada curves westward towards the Western Communities.

The intersection of Douglas Street and Dallas Road is the western end of the Trans-Canada Highway, known as "Mile 0". There is a small monument at the corner to recognize this fact along with a statue of Terry Fox. North from the water, Douglas passes the Beacon Lodge, forms the western border of Beacon Hill Park, and then passes behind the Empress Hotel and the Royal British Columbia Museum. Douglas Street forms the main north-south route through downtown Victoria. The annual Victoria Day Parade also marches down the street by starting at Mayfair Shopping Centre and ending at the British Columbia Legislature.

Before the construction of the Patricia Bay Highway in the late 1950s, Douglas Street extended a further 2.7 kilometres (1.7 mi) northward, ending at the current interchange of the Pat Bay Highway and Quadra Street. Two disconnected segments of this former extension, which were not overbuilt by the new artery, retain the name Douglas Street.

== Trivia ==
- Douglas Street is the most expensive property in the 1982 edition of the game Canadian Monopoly.
