= Gordon MacDonald (Alberta politician) =

Canadian politician

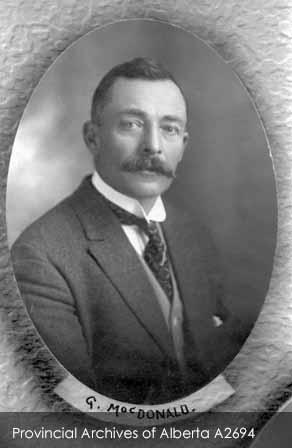

Member of the Legislative Assembly of Alberta
- In office April 17, 1913 – July 18, 1921
- Preceded by: Henry William McKenney
- Succeeded by: George MacLachlan
- Constituency: Pembina

Personal details
- Born: December 26, 1873 Leicester, England
- Died: February 4, 1941 (aged 67)
- Party: provincial Liberal
- Spouse: Jessie MacDonald

Military service
- Allegiance: Canada
- Branch/service: Canadian Expeditionary Force
- Years of service: 1916-1918
- Rank: Private
- Unit: 202nd Battalion

Gordon MacDonald (December 26, 1873 – February 24, 1941) was a politician from Alberta, Canada.

MacDonald was first elected to the Alberta Legislature in the 1913 general election. He defeated Conservative candidate F.D. Armitage by 11 votes to win his first term in office. He enlisted in World War I and went to fight overseas while still a member of the Assembly. He was acclaimed to his seat in the 1917 general election under Section 38 of the Elections Act, which stipulated that an incumbent member involved in combat would be automatically returned without challenge in his district. MacDonald retired from provincial politics at the end of his term in 1921.

Legislative Assembly of Alberta
Preceded by Henry William McKenney	MLA Pembina; 1913-1921	Succeeded by George MacLachlan
