= George MacLachlan =

Canadian politician

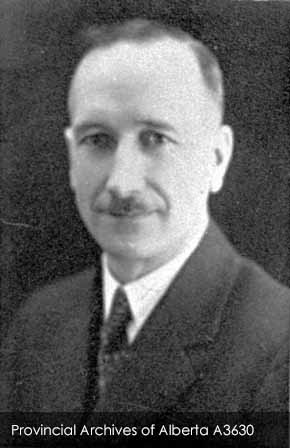

Member of the Legislative Assembly of Alberta
- In office 1921–1935
- Constituency: Pembina
- In office 1940–1944

Personal details
- Born: February 7, 1881 Glasgow, Scotland
- Died: November 23, 1962 (aged 81)
- Party: United Farmers

George MacLachlan (February 7, 1881 – November 23, 1962) was a provincial level politician from Alberta, Canada. He was born in Glasgow, Scotland.

== Early life ==
MacLachlan and his family would move to the area of Clyde, Alberta in 1904. The edge of his homestead would later be surveyed by the government and become part of Highway 2, when construction began in 1906. He began his political career on the municipal level when he was elected twice to the serve on the local council in 1907 and 1909. He served on the council with future premier Herbert Greenfield. George was especially interested in maintaining and improving the local roads.

== Provincial politics ==
MacLachlan first ran for the Alberta Legislature and was elected as a United Farmers of Alberta candidate in the 1921 Alberta general election. He would enjoy a relatively long career in provincial politics serving 18 years and 4 terms in the Legislative Assembly. George was also the last of the United Farmers to serve as a member of the Assembly.

In the 1935 Alberta general election MacLachlan was defeated for the first time by almost 2000 votes in a landslide finishing 3rd to Harry Knowlton Brown of the Social Credit party. He would attempt to regain his seat running in the 1940 Alberta general election. He was returned to his 4th term in the Legislative Assembly, this time as an Independent. He defeated Brown by 100 votes on ballot transfer.

MacLachlan would be defeated again in the 1944 Alberta general election This time he was defeated by Robin Jorgenson from Social Credit. He retired from provincial politics after that.

Legislative Assembly of Alberta
Preceded by Gordon MacDonald	MLA Pembina; 1921–1935	Succeeded by Harry Knowlton Brown
Preceded by Harry Knowlton Brown	MLA Pembina; 1940–1944	Succeeded by Robin Jorgenson
