= Beacon Drive In =

Restaurant in Canada

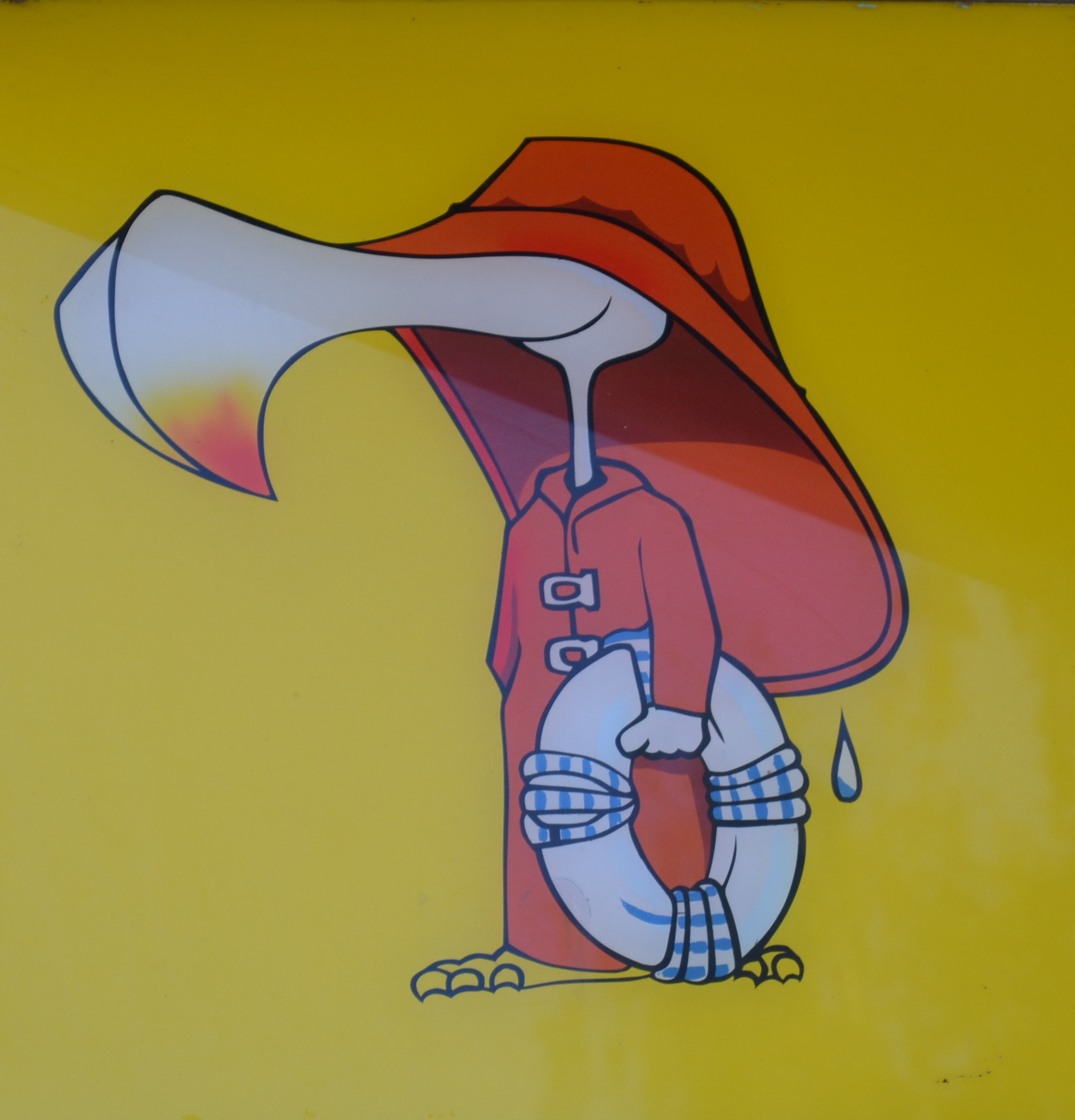

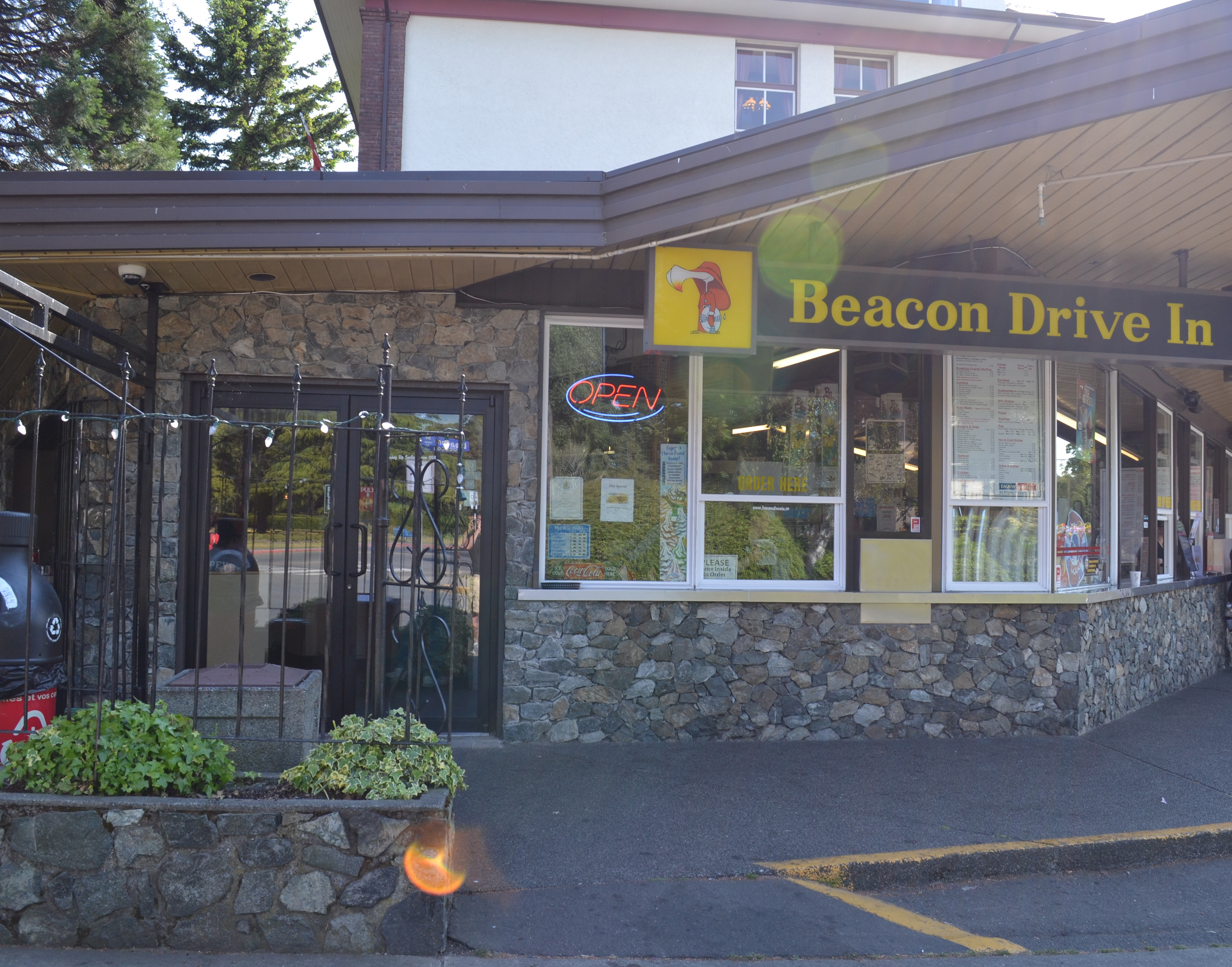
- Entrance
- Interactive map of Beacon Drive In

Restaurant information
- Established: 1958; 68 years ago
- Owners: Gus and Peter Loubardeas
- Previous owners: Bill Pistol and Bob Macmillan
- Food type: Fast food (ice cream, hamburgers, french fries, onion rings, hot dogs)
- Location: 126 Douglas St, Victoria, British Columbia, V8V 2N9, Canada
- Coordinates: 48°24′41.4″N 123°22′07.32″W
- Website: beacondrivein.ca

The Beacon Drive In is a restaurant in Victoria, British Columbia, Canada.

== History ==
The Beacon Drive In was originally established in 1958 by Bill Pistol and Bob Macmillan in what had been, since 1914, a private house. Although it started as a drive-in with an interior dining area, the drive-in was replaced with windows at which an order could be placed and food taken to the car.

Located at 126 Douglas Street, the Beacon Drive In is directly across from the 75 ha (190 acres) Beacon Hill Park, which does not allow food to be sold within the park grounds. That made the restaurant popular with the park's patrons, with milkshakes and soft serve ice cream becoming particular favourites.

The Beacon Drive In was owned by Harry Douglas, who turned it over to his son Jim in 1963. According to the restaurant, Jim Douglas followed two mottoes: "the customer always comes first" and "we don’t change."

== Today ==
In 2005, the current owners, Calgarians Gus and Peter Loubardeas (father and son), bought the restaurant and vowed to keep it the same. The restaurant has since made few changes despite having been open for more than 60 years. Some renovations, including outdoor heating, an awning, repainting in new colours, and updates to the kitchen have been made, but overall, the facility has not changed. According to Peter "our top 10 selling items have been the same for past 40 years!"

Today the restaurant has a full menu, and it is claimed that "...the home-cooked breakfasts are still the best and cheapest in town."

== Mascot ==
Beacon Bill has served as both the mascot and logo since 1978. Conceived and drawn by Bill Hitchcox, an artist from the local community, Beacon Bill is an anthropomorphized gull in a raincoat carrying a life preserver. The mascot/logo was requested by the printer that produced the menus.
