= Harry Knowlton Brown =

Canadian Politician

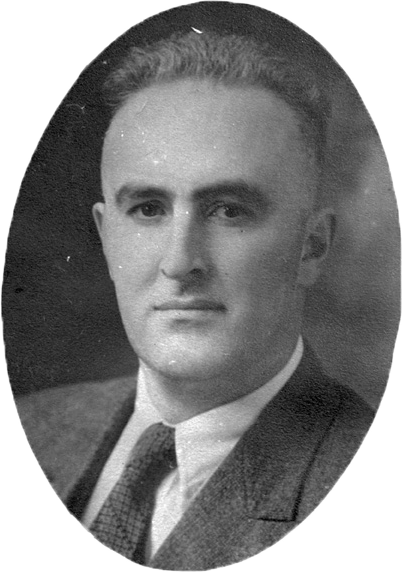

Member of the Legislative Assembly of Alberta
- In office 1935–1940
- Preceded by: George MacLachlan
- Succeeded by: George MacLachlan
- Constituency: Pembina

Personal details
- Born: December 13, 1897 Kings County, Nova Scotia
- Died: November 15, 1974 (aged 76) Ottawa, Ontario
- Party: Social Credit
- Occupation: Dentist

Harry Knowlton Brown (December 13, 1897 – November 15, 1974) was a provincial politician from Alberta, Canada. He served as a member of the Legislative Assembly of Alberta from 1935 to 1940, sitting with the Social Credit caucus in government. He was also a dentist who served as Director of Dental Public Health in the Department of National Health and Welfare in Ottawa.
