= Beacon Hill Park =

Park in British Columbia, Canada

Coordinates: 48.412°N 123.364°W

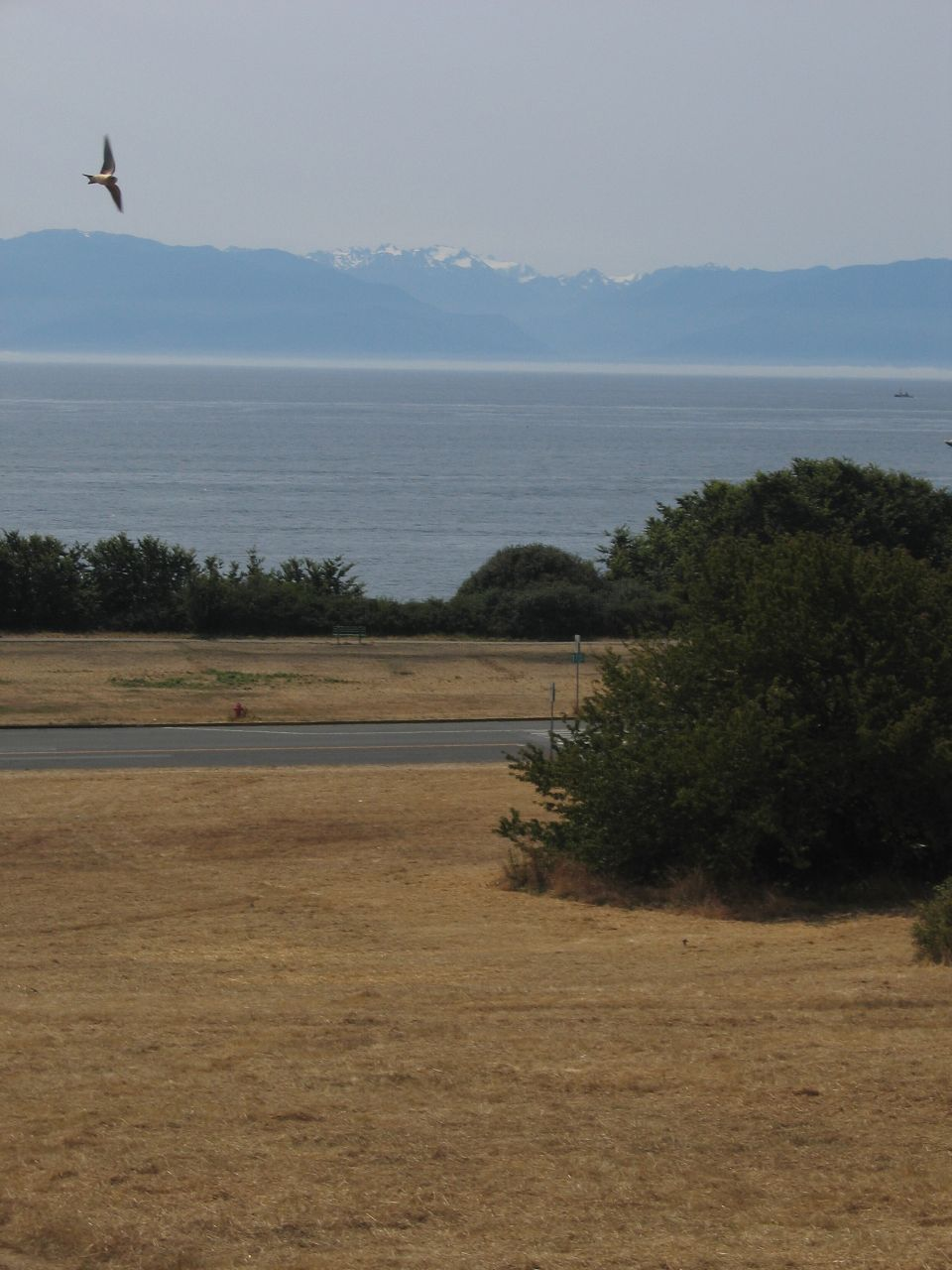
- View towards the Strait and the Olympic Range
- Interactive map of Beacon Hill Park
- Type: Public park
- Location: Victoria, British Columbia
- Created: 1882
- Operator: City of Victoria
- Website: www.victoria.ca/parks-recreation/parks-trails/our-parks/beacon-hill-park

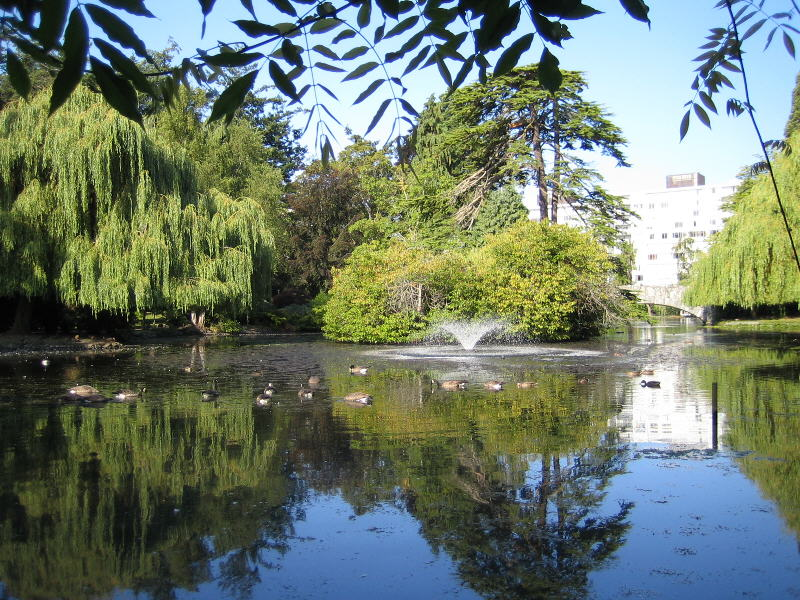
A view of the Goodacre Lake fountain and pond inside the park, seen with many dabbling ducks

Beacon Hill Park is a 75 ha (190 acres) park located along the shore of Juan de Fuca Strait in Victoria, British Columbia that is popular both with tourists and locals. The park contains a number of amenities including woodland and shoreline trails, two playgrounds, a waterpark, playing fields, a children's farm, tennis and pickleball courts, many ponds, and landscaped gardens.

The name of the park refers to Beacon Hill, a hill located at the park's southern end. The traditional name of the hill is míqәn (pronounced "MEE-qan", sometimes spelled Meegan or Meeacan) to the Songhees people, meaning "warmed by the sun".

== History ==
míqәn (Beacon Hill) was a popular location for local indigenous peoples to rest and play games, and where camas and great camas bulbs were harvested. At the base of the hill was the location of a settlement periodically occupied from approximately 1000 to 300 years prior to present-day. The hill is culturally significant, having been a burial site for the First Nations Coast Salish people, who are the original inhabitants of the Greater Victoria region.

The land ultimately made into the park was set aside as a protected area by Sir James Douglas, governor of the Colony of Vancouver Island in 1858. In 1882, the land was officially made a municipal park of the City of Victoria, and given its present name. The name was derived from the hill at the southern end of the park, which had also been used to host navigational beacons. It provides scenic vistas of the Strait and the Olympic Mountains of Washington.

== Ecology ==
Although much of the park has been landscaped into gardens and playing fields, and populated with various structures, a great deal of the native flora has been preserved. Garry oak, arbutus, Douglas-fir, western redcedar, camas, trillium, snowberry, Oregon grape, and fawn lily still remain in the park, as well as the threatened Yellow Montane Violet.

Peacocks and squirrels are present throughout the park, and occasionally raccoons and river otters can be seen. The ponds in the park are noted for their swans, turtles, ducks, Canada geese, and blue herons. Commonly seen duck species in the park include common mallard, American wigeon, Eurasian wigeon, Hooded merganser and Bufflehead. Many other bird species can be seen in the park including the Anna's hummingbird, Bald eagle, Red-breasted nuthatch and Common raven.

== Notable structures ==
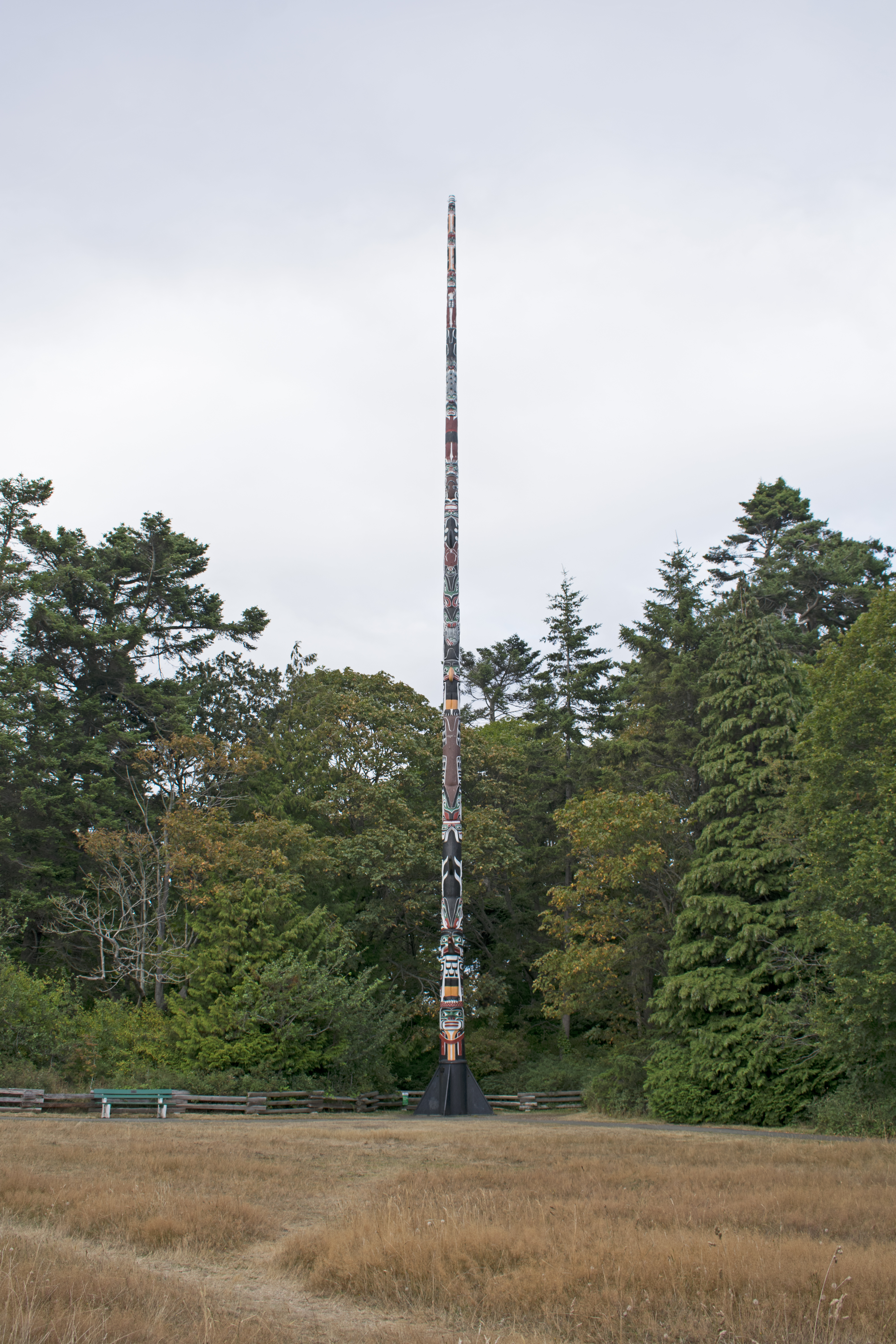
"The Story Pole", a totem pole erected in 1956, which was the tallest freestanding totem pole in the world

The park is notable for a few human-made features. Most prominent is the world's fourth-tallest totem pole, a 38.8 m (127 ft) work carved from a single cedar tree by Kwakwaka'wakw craftsman Chief Mungo Martin, his son David, and Henry Hunt. When erected in 1956 it was the tallest totem pole in the world. The pole has been repaired a number of times and was lowered from 2000-2001 for a significant restoration.

The pebble bridge over the stream between Goodacre and Fountain Lake is a tribute to renowned BC artist Emily Carr, erected by her sister Alice Carr in 1945.

In the middle of the park, the Cameron Bandshell, otherwise known as "The Stage", is the site of concerts from June through September.

"Mile 0" of the Trans-Canada Highway is at the south-west corner of the park, along with the old Beacon Lodge and the famous Beacon Drive-In.

== Amenities ==
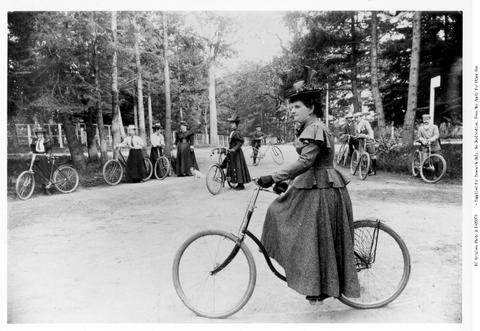
An image of Canadian photographer Hannah Maynard cycling in the park in 1892.

The park has numerous gardens, meadows, viewpoints, and trails. There is an off-leash dog area at the southern end of the park. The park also hosts numerous sports fields, including facilities for lawn bowling, cricket, baseball, tennis, and pickleball. There are two playgrounds and a number of public washrooms. The park is a popular location for picnics, relaxing, cycling and recreating and in the summer has a petting zoo.
