= Henry William McKenney =

Canadian politician

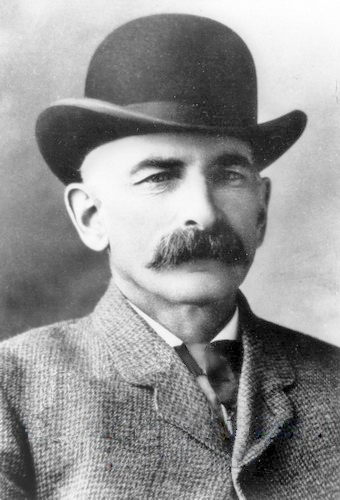
- McKenney pictured circa 1904

Member of the Legislative Assembly of Alberta
- In office November 1905 – July 1917
- Constituency: St. Albert (1905–09); Pembina (1909–13); Clearwater (1913–17)

Personal details
- Born: February 24, 1848 Amherstburg, Essex, Canada West
- Died: March 11, 1921 (aged 73) Edmonton, Alberta, Canada
- Party: Liberal Party of Alberta
- Spouse: Mary Risdale (m. 1885)
- Children: 7

Henry William McKenney (February 24, 1848 – March 11, 1921) was a politician from Alberta, Canada.

McKenney was born in Ontario, the son of a merchant and sailor. After attending schooling, he moved to Manitoba, where soon after he took part in the fur trade. He would briefly move back to Ontario, briefly working in the naval industry before working in the fur trade once again, until he ended up in the Northwest Territories while on a prospecting expedition. There he settled and established a mercantile business in St. Albert, where he settled and became one of its pioneer citizens, serving as the town's postmaster. After selling his business in 1903 and embarking on a trip for the benefit of his health, McKenney settled in Edmonton, where he would own several properties, including the McKenney Building. When Alberta became a province In 1905, he successfully ran for the newly formed Legislative Assembly of Alberta. He would win election twice more to the assembly, in 1909 and 1913, all times as a Liberal. He died in Edmonton in 1921.

== Early life ==
He was born in Amherstburg, Essex County, Ontario, in 1848, a son of Augustus and Matilda (née Grandin) McKenney. His mother was of French ancestry from Normandy, France, and his father, of Irish ancestry, was a mariner and merchant. Augustus McKenney came to Canada as a United Empire Loyalist, originally from Detroit, Michigan. McKenney attended primary Catholic and public schooling in his birthplace, until moving to the Red River Colony around 1862. Initially taking up the study of medicine, he soon found himself restless and entered the fur trade. After working in the industry for a couple years, including two years in his family's business, the McKenney family would return home to Amherstburg. There McKenney would go into the marine business, gaining employment with a Detroit company, working as a navigator and eventually receiving his mariner certification in 1869. Around this time, he would also embark his first trip to present-day Western Canada.

== Career ==
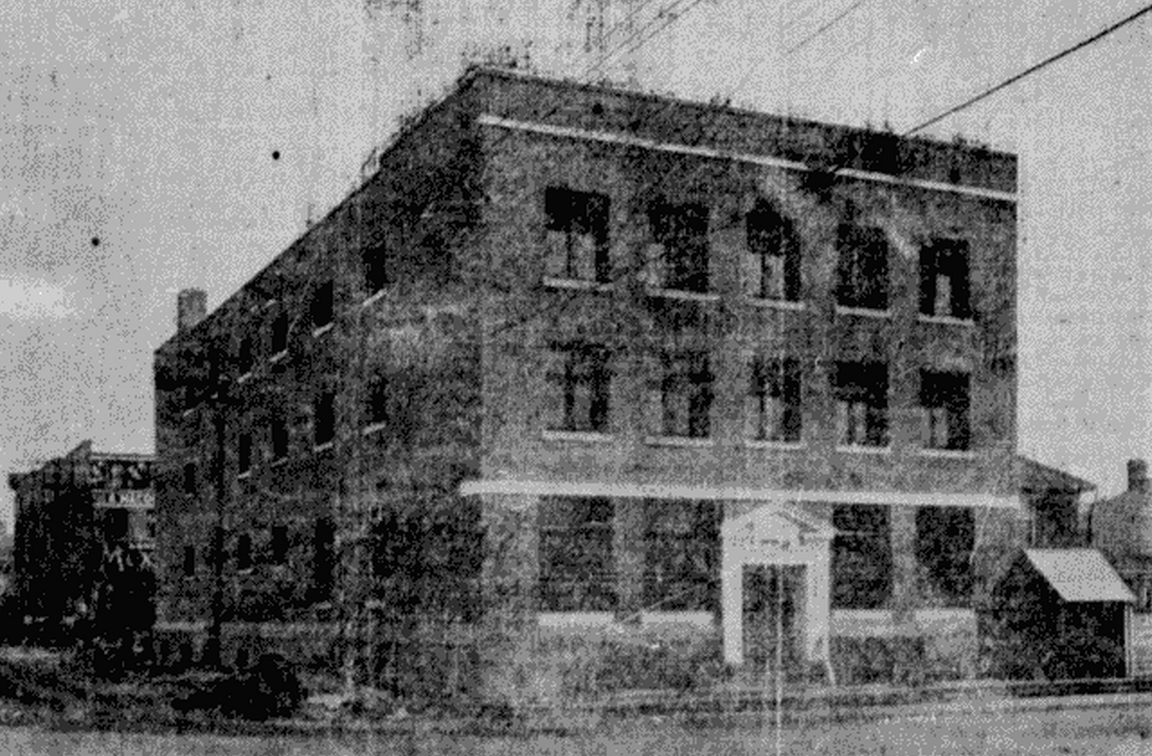
The McKenney Building in Edmonton, 1913

Faced with ill health, McKenney then moved to Minnesota, where he was a sutler during the 1869 Red River Rebellion. He would soon move back to Canada, in 1870 moving to Fort Garry and Portage la Prairie before settling at Westbourne, Manitoba, where he once again engaged in the fur trade, in his uncle's business, Henry McKenney & Company, and later in his father Augustus' business. Three years later he would move back to Fort Garry, which was now named Winnipeg; there he would work in a relative's hardware store for two years. On an 1875 trip to the Rocky Mountains on a coal expedition for the Centennial Exposition with a local geologist on which he was serving as an interpreter, McKenney would gain employment with the Hudson's Bay Company as a clerk. On that same trip he would also pass through Fort Edmonton for the first time. In 1883, he later moved to St. Albert, Alberta, where he opened up a store, one of the first businesses of the settlement. He would operate it until 1903, when he sold the business. In St. Albert he also sat on the town's school board as well serving as license commissioner, postmaster (1886–93), justice of the peace, and police magistrate. He also operated a grist mill and was a construction advocate, assisting in building a bridge in 1887. On January 3, 1885, he and Edmonton businessman Alex Taylor would make the first phone call on the first long distance phone system in the Northwest, from McKenney's store to Taylor's office in Edmonton, 14 kilometres (8.7 miles) away. He also played a part in gaining village status for St. Albert, which was incorporated in December 1899.

In 1903, again due to ill health, he would travel once again, this time taking a trip of the Pacific coast, through the neighbouring province of British Columbia, then through the United States, passing through Washington, Oregon, and California. He would later return to Canada and this time settle in the city Edmonton, close to his former residence of St. Albert.

In Edmonton, McKenney was a prominent property owner, owning farms and houses around the city. He was also the original owner and namesake of the McKenney building, a historical 3 story brick faced office building built in Edmonton in 1912 and located at 10187 104 Street. It was originally leased out by a school supply company, a foot ware store, and a fruit market.

== Political career ==
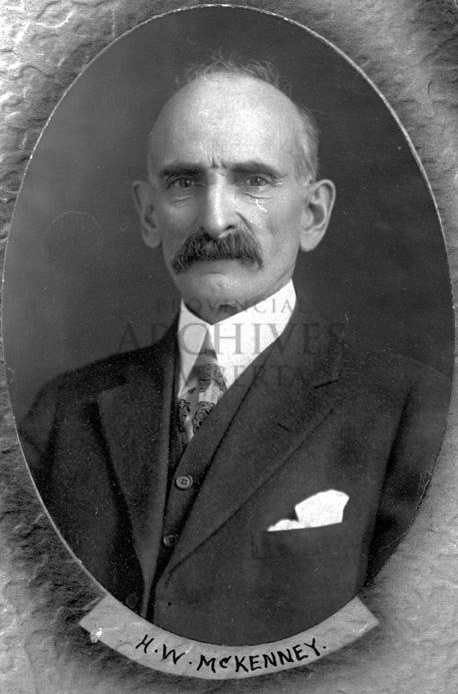
McKenney as a Member of the Legislature

A lifelong Liberal, McKenney was first elected to the Legislative Assembly of Alberta in the 1905 Alberta general election in the provincial electoral district of St. Albert. In this election he won as an Independent Liberal, but joined the Liberal caucus.

After redistribution of riding boundaries in the 1909 Alberta general election McKenney was returned to the assembly by acclamation in the brand new riding of Pembina to a second term in office. He was nominated under the Liberal banner in that election.

He won his third term in office again in a new riding in the controversial Clearwater district. The district was controversial because it was created with only 74 enumerated residents. His election victory was not an easy one and he won the election by a single vote, and won only 39% of the popular vote cast. He retired before the 1917 Alberta general election. During his time in office, he was well-regarded as a man of strong personality.

== Personal life ==
McKenney was the nephew of prominent Manitoba merchant Henry McKenney. He was also later the nephew of Manitoba Lieutenant Governor John Christian Schultz, whose father, William Ludwig Schultz had married into the family twice; he married McKenney's widowed grandmother Elizabeth, having with her John Christian Schultz. Upon her death, William Ludwig would then marry again, to Henry William McKenney's widowed mother, Matilda (Augustus McKenney died in 1873).

On January 12, 1885, Henry Willam McKenney married Mary Risdale, an English immigrant from Manchester. With her he would have seven children: Maud, John Christian, Aloysia Agnes, Frederick, Alice, Frances, and Albert Edward. In St. Albert, he was involved with the First Agricultural Society, serving as its commissioner and secretary-treasurer. At Edmonton, he was a member of the Knights of Columbus, and a member of the Roman Catholic Church, where he was active in the Mutual Benefit Association, at one time serving as its president. At one point, he was the only Roman Catholic in the Alberta Legislature. In Edmonton he was also a member of the Edmonton and Canadian Clubs, as well as the Edmonton Old Timers' Association. He was an avid traveller; apart from his California trip, he also engaged on a trip to Great Britain and Ireland around 1907. He also enjoying reading, and spoke fluent French.

== Death and legacy ==
McKenney died on March 11, 1921, at a hospital in Edmonton, after a long illness. He was survived by his widow and seven children (three sons and four daughters). The Edmonton Bulletin lamented his death, describing him as a "genuine scholar" and "courteous and gallant gentleman", stating that "his death removes from the rapidly disappearing group of old timers, who labored so lovingly the Edmonton ... might prosper". The 1912 publication, History of the province of Alberta noted on McKenney: "The name of Henry William McKenney has been inscribed high on the roll of honored pioneers of the great Northwest and as one of the most eminent citizens of Edmonton, in the development of which he has taken such a prominent part".

McKenney Street in St. Albert is named in his honour.

== Electoral history ==
=== 1905 general election ===
1905 Alberta general election results		Turnout N/A		Swing	
Affiliation	Candidate	Votes	%	Party	Personal
Independent Liberal	Henry W. McKenney	407	51.00%	*	
Liberal	Lucien Boudreau	391	49.00%	*	
Total		798	100%		
Rejected, Spoiled and Declined		Unknown			
Unknown Eligible Electors
Independent Liberal pickup new district				Swing N/A	

=== 1909 general election ===
1909 Alberta general election results		Turnout N/A		Swing	
Affiliation	Candidate	Votes	%	Party	Personal
Liberal	Henry W. McKenney	Acclaimed	—	*	
Total		—	—		
Rejected, Spoiled and Declined		Unknown			
Unknown Eligible Electors
Liberal pickup new district				Swing N/A	

=== 1913 general election ===
1913 Alberta general election: Clearwater
Party	Candidate	Votes	%
Liberal	Henry William McKenney	40	38.83%
Conservative	A. Williamson Taylor	39	37.86%
Socialist	Joseph Andrew Clarke	24	23.30%
Total		103	–
Source(s) Source: "Clearwater Official Results 1913 Alberta general election". Alberta Heritage Community Foundation.

== Bibliography ==
- Blue, John (1924), Alberta: Past and Present, Historical and Biographical, vol. 2, Chicago, Illinois: Pioneer Historical Publishing Co.
- Legal, Emile Joseph (1914), Short sketches of the history of the Catholic churches and missions in central Alberta, Winnipeg, Manitoba: West Canada Publishing
- MacRae, Archibald Oswald (1912), History of the province of Alberta, vol. 2, Calgary, Alberta: Western Canada History Co, archived from the original on 2015-09-24
- Salesman Publishing Company (1906), Souvenir of Alberta: Being a general résumé of the province, with portraits, engravings and biographies of a number of men who have helped to build this great new province of the West, Winnipeg, Manitoba: Salesman Publishing Company
- St. Albert Historical Society (1985), The Black Robe's Vision : A History of St. Albert & District. Volume 1, St. Albert, Alberta: St. Albert Historical Society, archived from the original on 2015-09-24

Legislative Assembly of Alberta
Preceded by New District	MLA St. Albert; 1905–1909	Succeeded by Lucien Boudreau
Preceded by New District	MLA Pembina; 1909–1913	Succeeded by Gordon MacDonald
Preceded by New District	MLA Clearwater; 1913–1917	Succeeded by Joseph State
