= Fairmont Hotel (Winnipeg, Manitoba) =

Hotel in Winnipeg, Manitoba, Canada

Fairmont Winnipeg
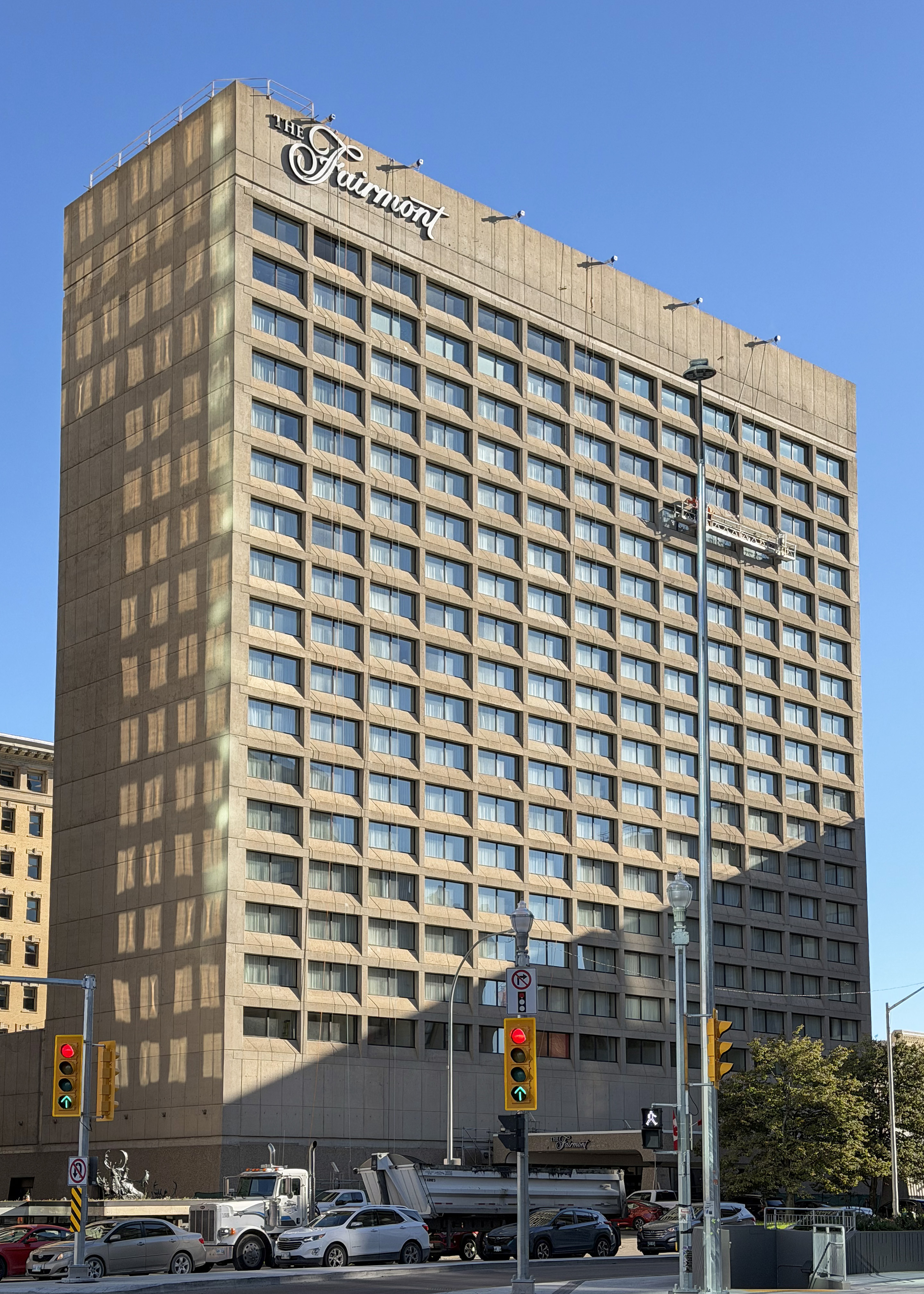

General information
- Architectural style: Modernist
- Location: 2 Lombard Place, Winnipeg, Manitoba, Canada
- Coordinates: 49.8957963°N 97.1369807°W
- Opening: 1970
- Owner: Lombard Hospitality Limited (James Richardson & Sons Limited)
- Operator: Fairmont Hotels & Resorts

Technical details
- Floor count: 21

Design and construction
- Architects: Smith Carter; Skidmore, Owings & Merrill
- Developer: Subsidiary of James Richardson & Sons Limited

Other information
- Number of rooms: 340

Website
- Official website

The Fairmont Winnipeg is a high-rise hotel at the northwest corner of Portage and Main in downtown Winnipeg, Manitoba, Canada. Completed in 1970 as the Winnipeg Inn, it later operated as the Westin Winnipeg and The Lombard before adopting the Fairmont brand in the late 1990s.

== History ==
Built from 1968 to 1970 as part of the Lombard Place development, the 21-storey reinforced concrete tower opened as the Winnipeg Inn (1970–1981), a full-service business hotel.

It was rebranded to Westin Winnipeg in 1981, operating through the 1980s and early 1990s.

In the late 1990s, Canadian Pacific Hotels briefly marketed it as The Lombard before adopting the Fairmont Winnipeg name.

The brand continued after the hotel's 2024 purchase by Lombard Hospitality Limited, a James Richardson & Sons subsidiary.

== Architecture and design ==
The building was designed by Smith Carter Searle in association with Skidmore, Owings & Merrill, with Poole Construction as contractor. Typical of late-modern Winnipeg towers, it features exposed site-cast concrete recessed windows, and an aggregate-finished entrance canopy.

== Facilities and connections ==
The hotel has 340 guestrooms with access to the Portage & Main underground concourse and Winnipeg Walkway via the Richardson Centre Concourse. It also features an indoor saltwater pool and health club on an upper floor with city views.

== See also ==
- Richardson Building (Winnipeg)
- Portage and Main
- Winnipeg Walkway
