= Joseph State =

Canadian politician and physician

Joseph Ephraim State

Member of the Legislative Assembly of Alberta
- In office June 7, 1917 – August 10, 1923
- Preceded by: Henry William McKenney
- Succeeded by: District Abolished
- Constituency: Clearwater

Personal details
- Born: June 15, 1867 London, Ontario
- Died: August 10, 1923 (aged 56)
- Party: Liberal
- Education: Detroit College of Medicine and Surgery
- Occupation: Physician, surgeon

Joseph Ephraim State (June 15, 1867 – August 10, 1923) was a Canadian provincial level politician and physician from Alberta.

== Early life ==
Joseph Ephraim State was born June 15, 1867, in London, Ontario to James State and Mary State. He attended primary school in London and medical school at Detroit College of Medicine and Surgery.

== Political life ==
State was first elected to the Legislative Assembly of Alberta as a representative for the controversial electoral district of Clearwater after the retirement of long time Alberta Liberal Party MLA Henry William McKenney. He was elected to his 1st term in office in the 1917 Alberta general election and was re-elected in the 1921 Alberta general election. In that election he survived the United Farmers sweep that defeated the Liberal government from power in 1921, however no member of the United Farmers of Alberta ran in his district.

Legislative Assembly of Alberta
Preceded by Henry William McKenney	MLA Clearwater; 1917-1924	Succeeded by District Abolished
