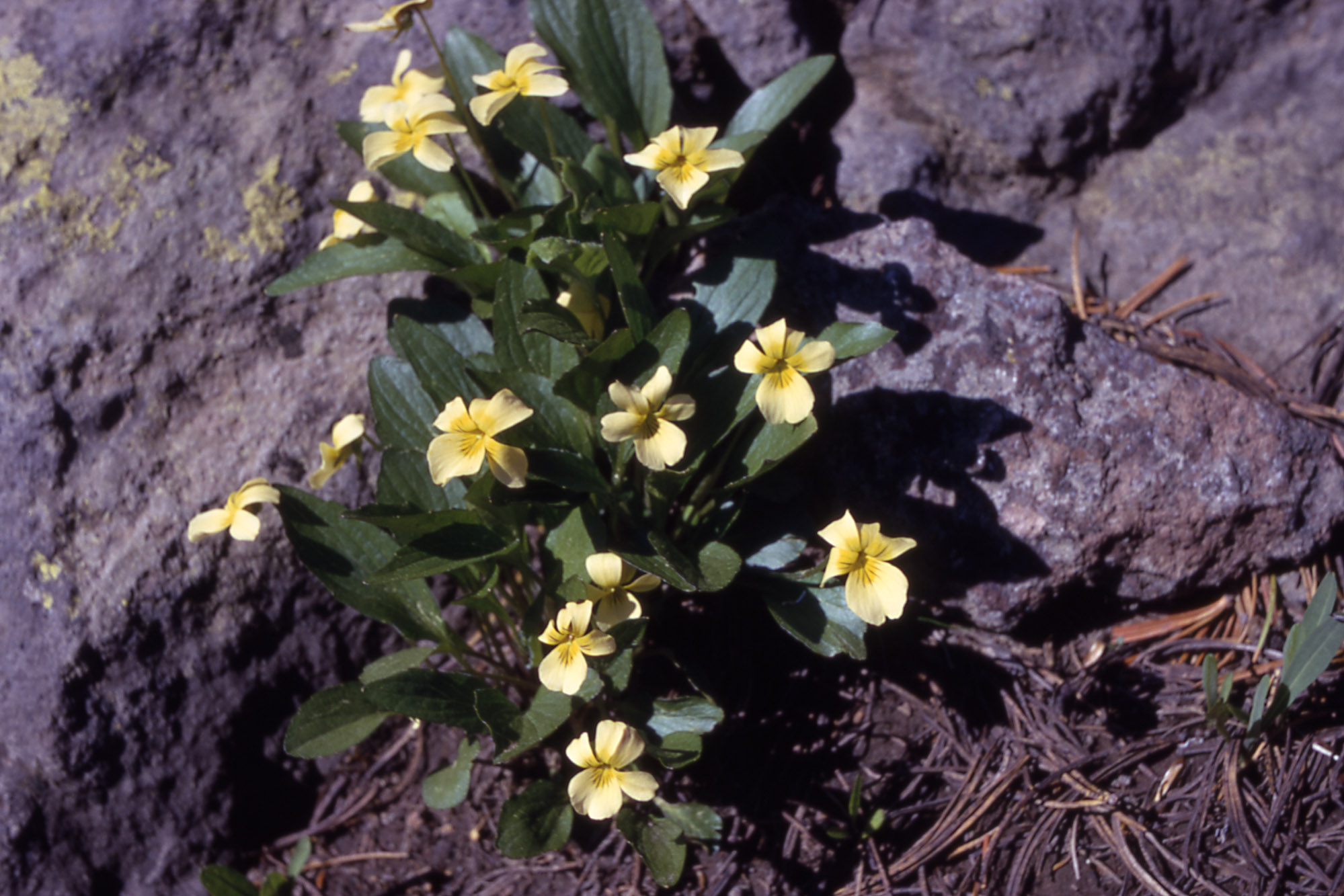
- Viola praemorsa in Yellowstone National Park

Conservation status
- Secure (NatureServe)

Scientific classification
- Kingdom: Plantae
- Clade: Tracheophytes
- Clade: Angiosperms
- Clade: Eudicots
- Clade: Rosids
- Order: Malpighiales
- Family: Violaceae
- Genus: Viola
- Species: V. praemorsa

Binomial name
- Viola praemorsa Douglas ex Lindl.

Synonyms
- V. nuttallii var. linguifolia (Nutt.) Jeps.

= Viola praemorsa =

Species of flowering plant

Viola praemorsa is a species of violet known by the common names canary violet, Astoria violet, yellow montane violet, and upland yellow violet.

== Description ==
This rhizomatous perennial herb grows up to 30 centimeters (12 in) in maximum height. The thick, fleshy leaf blades are lance-shaped to oval with pointed or rounded tips, the basal ones up to 8.5 centimeters (3.3 in) long and those higher on the stem the same or slightly longer. The leaf blades are often coated densely in hairs and are borne on long petioles. A solitary flower is borne on a long, upright stem. It has five yellow petals, the lowest three veined with brownish purple, and the upper two often with brownish purple coloring on the outer surfaces.

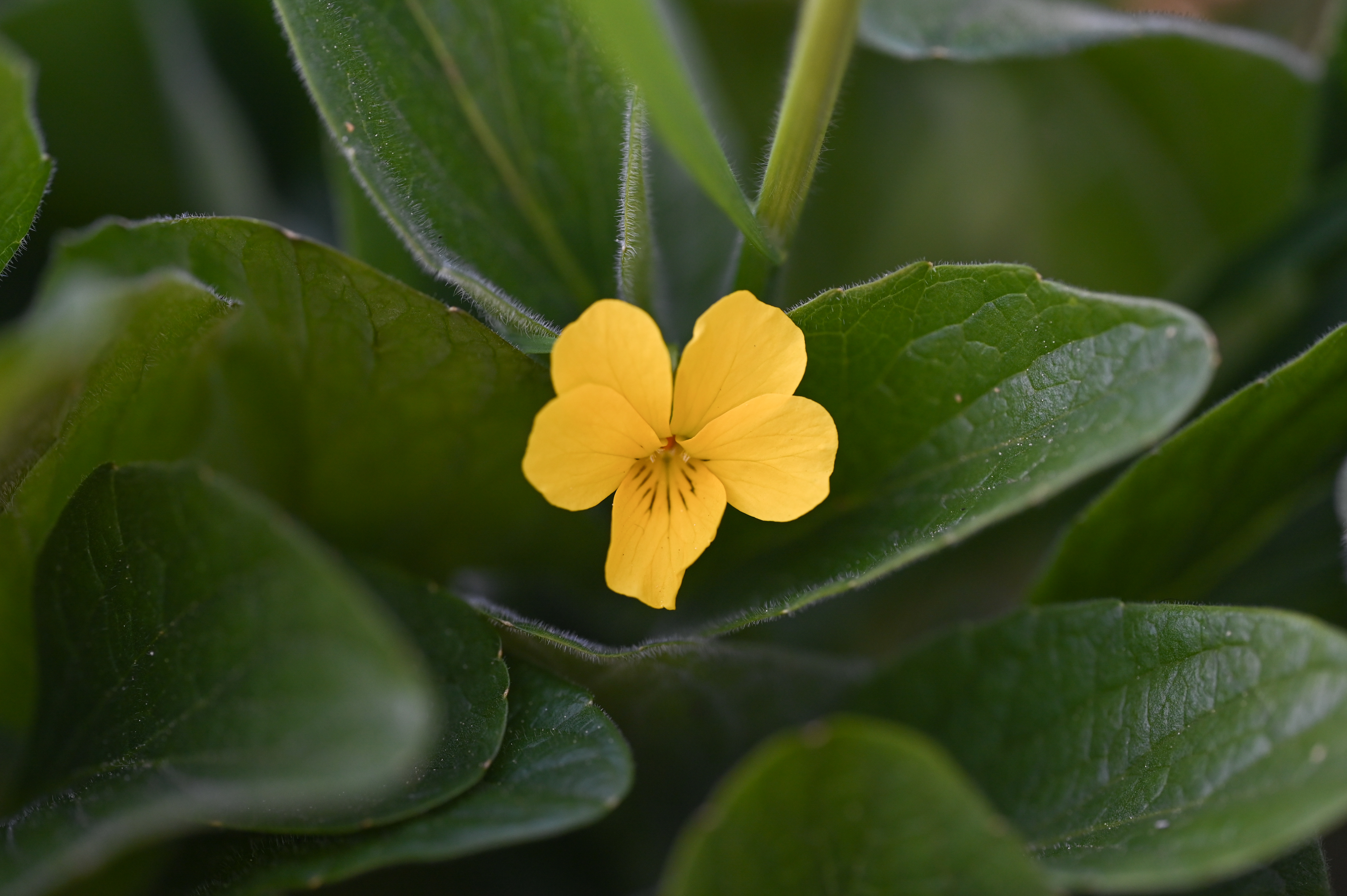
Viola praemorsa ssp. praemorsa flower closeup at Playfair Park in Saanich, British Columbia

== Taxonomy ==
There are three subspecies:

- Viola praemorsa subsp. praemorsa (Dougl. ex Lindl) – occurs in British Columbia, California, Montana, Oregon, and Washington.
- Viola praemorsa subsp. flavovirens (Pollard) Fabijan – occurs in Idaho, Montana, Utah, Washington, and Wyoming.
- Viola praemorsa subsp. linguaefolia (Nutt.) M.S. Baker & J.C. Clausen ex M.E. Peck – occurs in Alberta, California, Colorado, Montana, Nevada, Oregon, Utah, Washington, and Wyoming.

== Distribution and habitat ==
Viola praemorsa is native to western North America from British Columbia and Alberta in Canada; to Washington, Oregon, Idaho, Montana, Wyoming, Utah, California, Nevada, and Colorado in the U.S. It occurs on mountain slopes, usually where forests or grassy meadows are present, in moist or dry soil. In California, it often occurs in yellow-pine forests. In Canada, where it is an endangered species, V. praemorsa subsp. praemorsa is associated with Garry oak ecosystems.
