= Carl A. Muller =

Canadian politician

Carl Muller

Member of the Legislative Assembly of Alberta
- In office May 23, 1967 – August 30, 1971
- Preceded by: Robin Jorgenson
- Succeeded by: District Abolished
- Constituency: Pembina

Personal details
- Born: November 27, 1913
- Died: December 21, 1991 (aged 78)
- Party: Social Credit
- Occupation: politician

Adam Carl Muller (November 27, 1913 – December 21, 1991) was a politician from Alberta, Canada. He served in the Legislative Assembly of Alberta from 1967 to 1971 as a member of the Social Credit caucus in government.

== Political career ==
Muller ran for a seat to the Alberta Legislature in the 1967 Alberta general election. He ran as the Social Credit candidate in the electoral district of Pembina. He defeated Progressive Conservative candidate Edward Samuel by 800 votes to hold the district for his party.

Muller retired from provincial politics at dissolution of the legislature in 1971.
