= Robin Jorgenson =

Canadian politician

Robin Daniel Jorgenson

Member of the Legislative Assembly of Alberta
- In office July 8, 1944 – May 23, 1967
- Preceded by: George MacLachlan
- Succeeded by: Carl Muller
- Constituency: Pembina

Minister of Public Welfare
- In office January 5, 1954 – October 15, 1962
- Premier: Ernest Manning
- Preceded by: Leonard Halmrast
- Succeeded by: Leonard Halmrast

Personal details
- Born: February 28, 1894 Sleepy Eye, Minnesota
- Died: February 14, 1987 (aged 92)
- Party: Social Credit
- Occupation: politician

Robin Daniel "Bob" Jorgenson (March 28, 1894 – February 14, 1987) was a politician from Alberta, Canada. He served in the Legislative Assembly of Alberta from 1944 to 1967 as a member of the Social Credit caucus in government. He served as a cabinet minister in the government of Premier Ernest Manning from 1954 to 1962.

== Political career ==
Jorgenson first ran for a seat to the Alberta Legislature in the 1944 general election. He stood as the Social Credit candidate in the electoral district of Pembina. He defeated independent incumbent George MacLachlan by a landslide to pick up the seat for his party.

In the 1948 general election Jorgenson increased his popular vote and was returned with a much bigger landslide over two other candidates.

In the 1952 Alberta general election Jorgenson defeated two other candidates with a smaller majority than he obtained in the 1948 general election.

On January 5, 1954 Jorgenson was appointed Minister of Public Welfare by Premier Ernest Manning. In the 1955 general election, Jorgenson defeated Liberal candidate George Schultz and another candidate with just over half the popular vote.

In the 1959 general election Jorgenson won a three-way race with the largest share of the popular vote of his career.

Jorgenson was dropped from cabinet in a shuffle on October 15, 1962. In the 1963 general election he won a large majority over four other candidates.

Jorgenson retired from provincial politics at dissolution of the assembly in 1967.
