= List of licensed and localized editions of Monopoly: North America =

The following is a list of game boards of the Parker Brothers/Hasbro board game Monopoly adhering to a particular theme or particular locale in North America, excluding the United States, which has its own list. Lists for other regions can be found here. The game is licensed in 103 countries and printed in 37 languages.

== Canada ==
Major streets from cities across the country; from cheap to expensive: St. John's, Fredericton, Charlottetown, Halifax, Quebec City, Montreal, Ottawa, Mississauga, Toronto, Winnipeg, Regina, Edmonton, Calgary, Vancouver.

Canadian Edition (1982 release)

| Copyright date: 1982 | Released by: Parker | Issued through: General release, exclusive to Canada. |

| Free parking / Stationnement gratuit | Sussex Drive $220 | Chance | Yonge Street $220 | Bay Street $240 | C.P. Rail $200 | Portage & Main $260 | Victoria Avenue $260 | Gas company / Société de gaz $150 | Albert Street $280 | Go to jail / Allez en prison |
| Rue St-Jacques $200 | Canadian Edition (1982 release) | | | | | | | | | Jasper Avenue $300 |
| Rue Ste-Catherine $180 | Canadian Edition (1982 release) | | | | | | | | | St. Albert Trail $300 |
| Community Chest / Caisse Commune | Canadian Edition (1982 release) | | | | | | | | | Community Chest / Caisse Commune |
| Rue St-Jean $180 | Canadian Edition (1982 release) | | | | | | | | | Macleod Trail $320 |
| Ontario Northland $200 | Canadian Edition (1982 release) | | | | | | | | | B.C. Rail $200 |
| Spring Garden Road $160 | Canadian Edition (1982 release) | | | | | | | | | Chance |
| Barrington Street $140 | Canadian Edition (1982 release) | | | | | | | | | Granville Street $350 |
| Telephone Company / Compagnie de téléphone $150 | Canadian Edition (1982 release) | | | | | | | | | Luxury tax pay $75 / Payez $75 Taxe de luxe |
| University Avenue $140 | Canadian Edition (1982 release) | | | | | | | | | Douglas Street $400 |
| In jail / Just visiting // En prison / Pour une visite | Queen Street $120 | King Street $100 | Chance | Waterloo Row $100 | C.N. Rail $200 | Income Tax Pay 10% or $200 / Impôt sur le revenu Payez 10% ou $200 | Signal Hill $60 | Community Chest / Caisse Commune | Duckworth Street $60 | Collect $200 salary as you pass / Réclamez $200 de salaire en passant à GO |

Game description: This is the first Canadian Edition of Monopoly, released in 1982. The enclosed booklet describes the selection of the twenty-two colored properties and four railroads, from St John's; Fredericton; Charlottetown; Halifax; Quebec City; Montreal; Ottawa; Toronto; Winnipeg; Regina; Edmonton; Calgary; Vancouver; and Victoria. The four railroads included are Canadian National, Ontario Northland Railway, Canadian Pacific and BC Rail. Telephone Company and Gas Company take the places of Electric Company and Water Works, respectively. And the police officer illustrated on the Go to Jail space is redrawn to appear as a member of the Royal Canadian Mounted Police.
Tokens: Cannon, horse and rider, top hat, iron, battleship, race car, shoe, and beaver - the beaver is exclusive to this edition.
Other features: All aspects of printed text in the game are bilingual English/French, including the booklet about the game, the game's instructions, the Chance and Community Cards, game spaces on the board, and property cards.

Canadian Edition (2000 release)

| Copyright date: 2000 |

Game description: This is an edition featuring famous parks, buildings, airports, utilities, bridges, mountain trails, malls, and streets in Canada as properties. Included is the instruction booklet, and a bonus map of Canada that has pins on the properties in the game. The properties are Cabot Trail, Peggy's Cove, St. John's International Airport, Confederation Bridge, Grand Prix of Canada, West Edmonton Mall, Percé Rock, Cellular (utility), Magnetic Hill, Rogers Centre, Vancouver International Airport, Churchill, Manitoba, Assiniboine Park, Tunnels of Moose Jaw, Calgary Stampede, Banff National Park, Stanley Park.
Other features: This edition was released in honor of the 2000 World Monopoly Championship being held in Toronto.

French Canadian edition

| Released by: Hasbro |

| Stationnement Gratuit | Avenue Kentucky | Chance | Avenue Indiana | Avenue Illinois | Chemin de fer B. & O. | Avenue Atlantique | Avenue Ventnor | Aqueduc | Jardins Marvin | Allez en Prison |
| Avenue New York | French Canadian edition | | | | | | | | | Avenue Pacifique |
| Avenue Tennessee | French Canadian edition | | | | | | | | | Avenue Caroline du Nord |
| Caisse Commune | French Canadian edition | | | | | | | | | Caisse Commune |
| Place St-Jacques | French Canadian edition | | | | | | | | | Avenue Pennsylvanie |
| Chemin de fer Pennsylvanie | French Canadian edition | | | | | | | | | Chemin de fer Petit Réseau |
| Avenue Virginie | French Canadian edition | | | | | | | | | Chance |
| Avenue des États-Unis | French Canadian edition | | | | | | | | | Place du Parc |
| Compagnie d’Éléctricité | French Canadian edition | | | | | | | | | Taxe de Luxe |
| Place St-Charles | French Canadian edition | | | | | | | | | Promenade |
| En Prison / Pour une Visite | Avenue Connecticut | Avenue Vermont | Chance | Avenue de l’Orient | Chemin de fer Reading | Impôt sur le Revenu | Avenue de la Baltique | Caisse Commune | Avenue de la Méditerranée | Go. Réclamez $200 de salaire en passant à |

Game description: The standard French-Canadian version consists of French translations of the original US version.

I Luv London Edition

| Copyright date: 2009 | Released by: Big Brothers and Sisters, Farhi Holdings Corp. | Issued through: Canadian Tire stores and Libro Financial Group in London, Ontario. |

Game description: The I Luv London Edition revolves around locations and landmarks in London, Ontario. This edition was released in 2009 to benefit local charities, being sponsored by Big Brothers and Sisters and by Farhi Holdings Corp. The "Bank" is represented by Libro Financial Group, the sponsors take over the Chance and Community Chest spaces, and landmarks such as the Western Fair, streets such as Huron Road and Fanshawe College Street, and restaurants such as Boston Pizza make an appearance as purchasable properties. The humorous note is that the Jail is represented by Wendy's fast food restaurant; to go to jail means going to eat a meal at Wendy's, while the Just Visiting is represented by the drive-thru. Fortunately, there is no cost to eat at Wendy's.
Tokens: Token information unknown as yet.

== Costa Rica ==
Gran Banco with the states of Costa Rica.

== Guatemala ==
Bancopoly, with the states of Guatemala.

== Mexico ==
Mexico edition (1985)

| Estacionamiento Gratuito | Avenida de las Palmas | ¡Sorpresa! | Avenida 20 de Noviembre | Calzada de Tlalpan | Estación Pantaco | Plaza del Carmen | Plaza Miravalle | Servicio de Agua Potable | Plaza de la República | Vaya a la Cárcel |
| Avenida Consulado | Mexico edition (1985) | | | | | | | | | Avenida Chapultepec |
| Calle Ayuntamiento | Mexico edition (1985) | | | | | | | | | Avenida Madero |
| Tesoreria | Mexico edition (1985) | | | | | | | | | Tesoreria |
| Calle Victoria | Mexico edition (1985) | | | | | | | | | Avenida Juarez |
| Ferrocarril Hidalgo | Mexico edition (1985) | | | | | | | | | Ferrocarril de Cuernavaca |
| Avenida Cuauhtemoc | Mexico edition (1985) | | | | | | | | | ¡Sorpresa! |
| Avenida Coyoacan | Mexico edition (1985) | | | | | | | | | Paseo de la Reforma |
| Compañía de Luz | Mexico edition (1985) | | | | | | | | | Impuesto de Lujo (Luxury Tax) |
| Avenida Universidad | Mexico edition (1985) | | | | | | | | | Avenida Insurgentes |
| Cárcel | Avenida Alvaro Obregón | Avenida México | ¡Sorpresa! | Avenida Nuevo León | Estación de Buenavista | Impuesto sobre Capital (Income Tax) | Calle Humboldt | Tesoreria | Calle Colón | Salida |

Game description: The properties are streets in Mexico City.

Mexico Edition - Turista

== Panama ==
Includes the most popular tourist destinations in Panama and the main goal is to be the winner by making the largest Hotel chain spread across all the country.
