= Henry McKenney (merchant) =

Henry McKenney (c. 1826 – 1886) was a merchant from Amherstburg, Upper Canada.

McKenney was a merchant in Amherstburg until the business became financially troubled. He, his wife and one son moved west to Upper Fort Garry arriving in June 1859. He started the first hotel in what would shortly become Manitoba.

McKenney originally purchased the land upon which Portage and Main sits on June 2, 1862. He chose land where the north–south and east–west ox cart paths crossed, in order to build a general store with his half-brother John Christian Schultz.
