= Rose Manor =

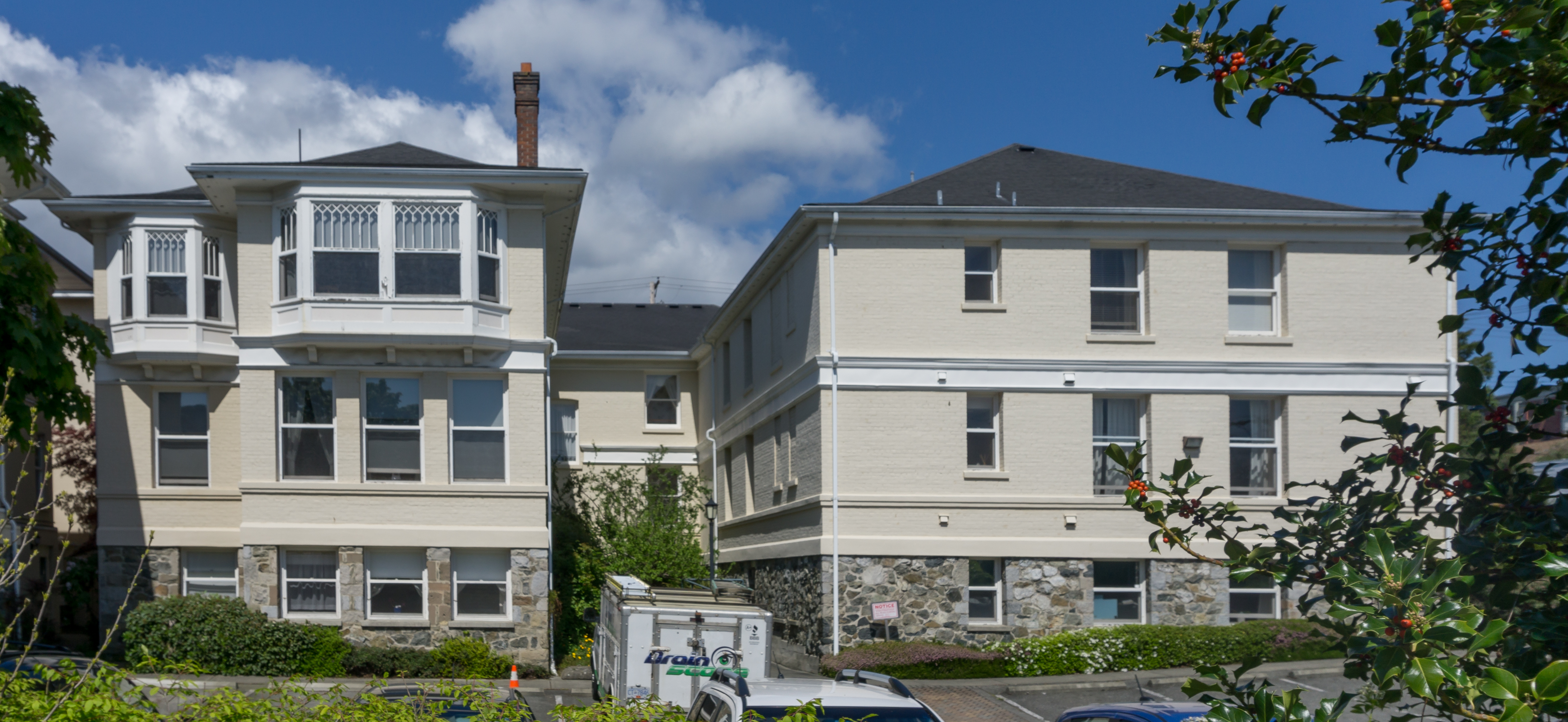
- The building's exterior in 2018
- Interactive map of the Rose Manor area

General information
- Location: 730 Quadra Street, Victoria, British Columbia, Canada
- Coordinates: 48.4205°N 123.3606°W

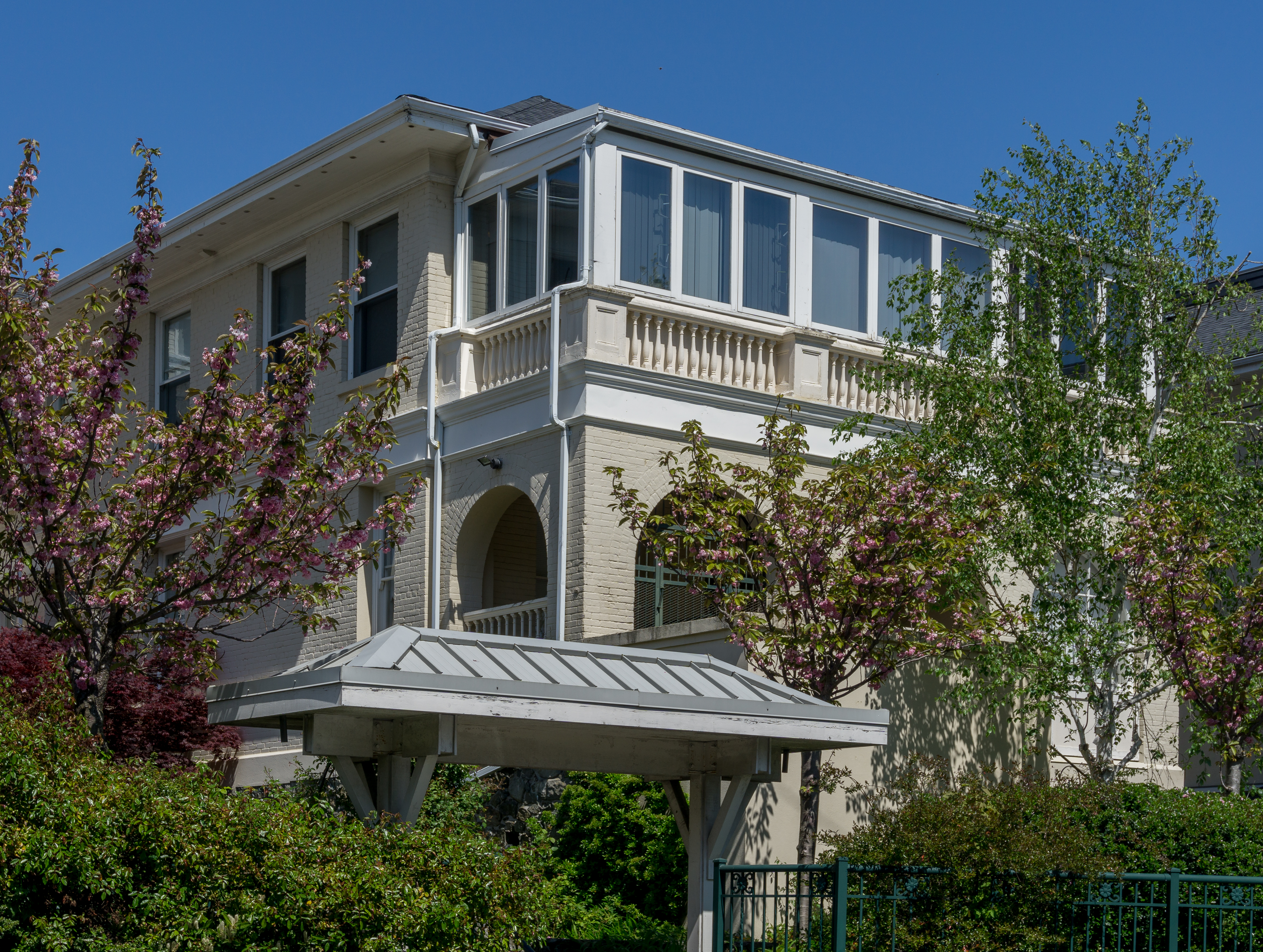
Exterior

Rose Manor is an historic building in Victoria, British Columbia, Canada. It is a retirement residence with interior features including a rotunda and a stained-glass skylight.

== See also ==
- List of historic places in Victoria, British Columbia
