= Rithet =

Rithet may refer to:

- Robert Paterson Rithet (1844-1919), Canadian mayor of Victoria, British Columbia
- R.P. Rithet, British Columbia sternwheeler
- Rithet Building, Canadian historic building in Victoria
