= H. Saunders Grocery and Liquor Store =

Building in British Columbia, Canada

- Victoria Paper Box Building
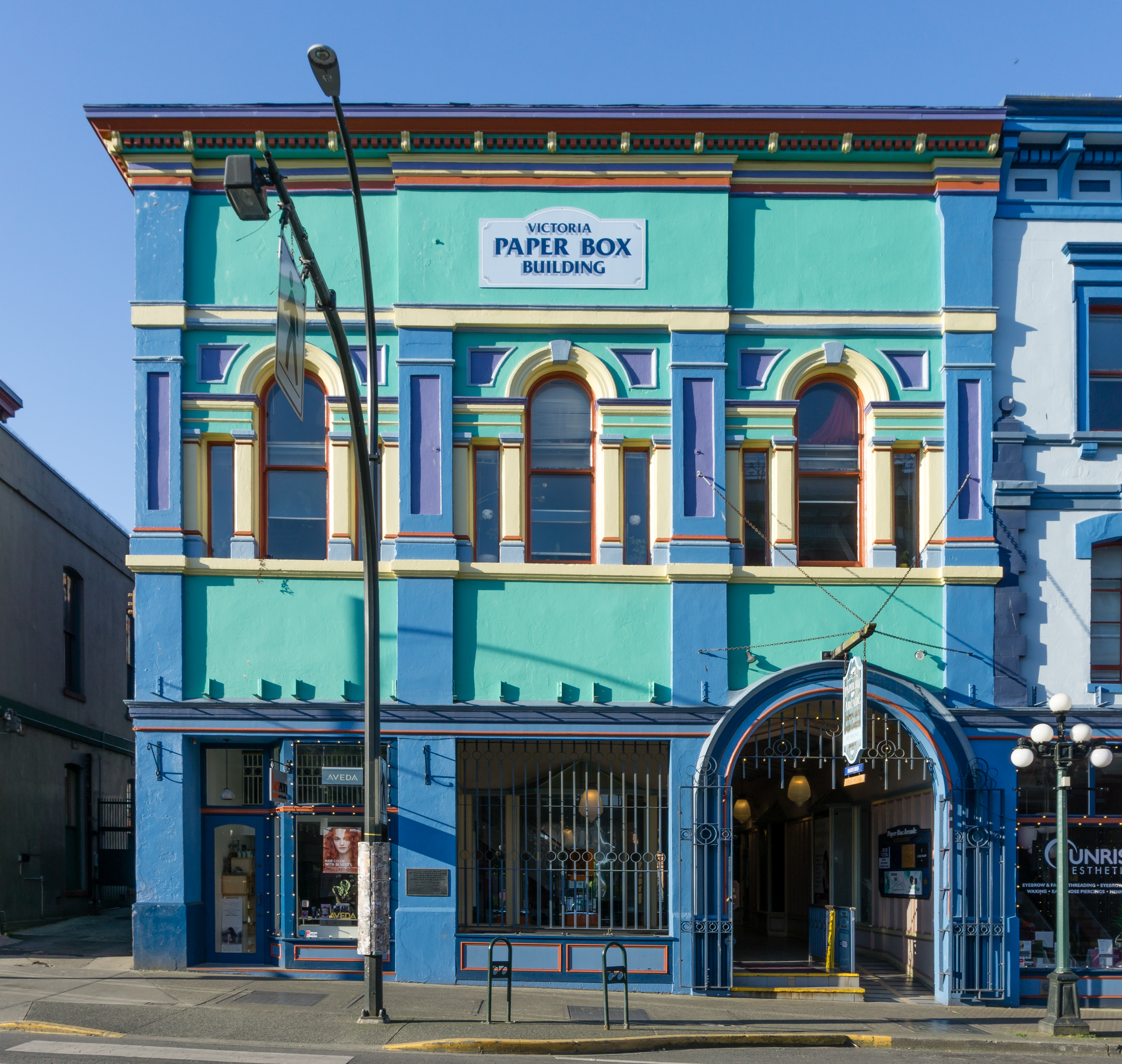
- The building's exterior in 2018
- Interactive map of the H. Saunders Grocery and Liquor Store area

General information
- Type: Retail Store
- Location: 561-563 Johnson Street, Victoria, British Columbia, Canada
- Coordinates: 48.4275°N 123.3686°W
- Completed: 1890

Technical details
- Floor count: 3

The H. Saunders Grocery and Liquor Store, or sometimes called Victoria Paper Box Building, is an historic building in Victoria, British Columbia, Canada.

== See also ==
- List of historic places in Victoria, British Columbia
