= Reynolds Block =

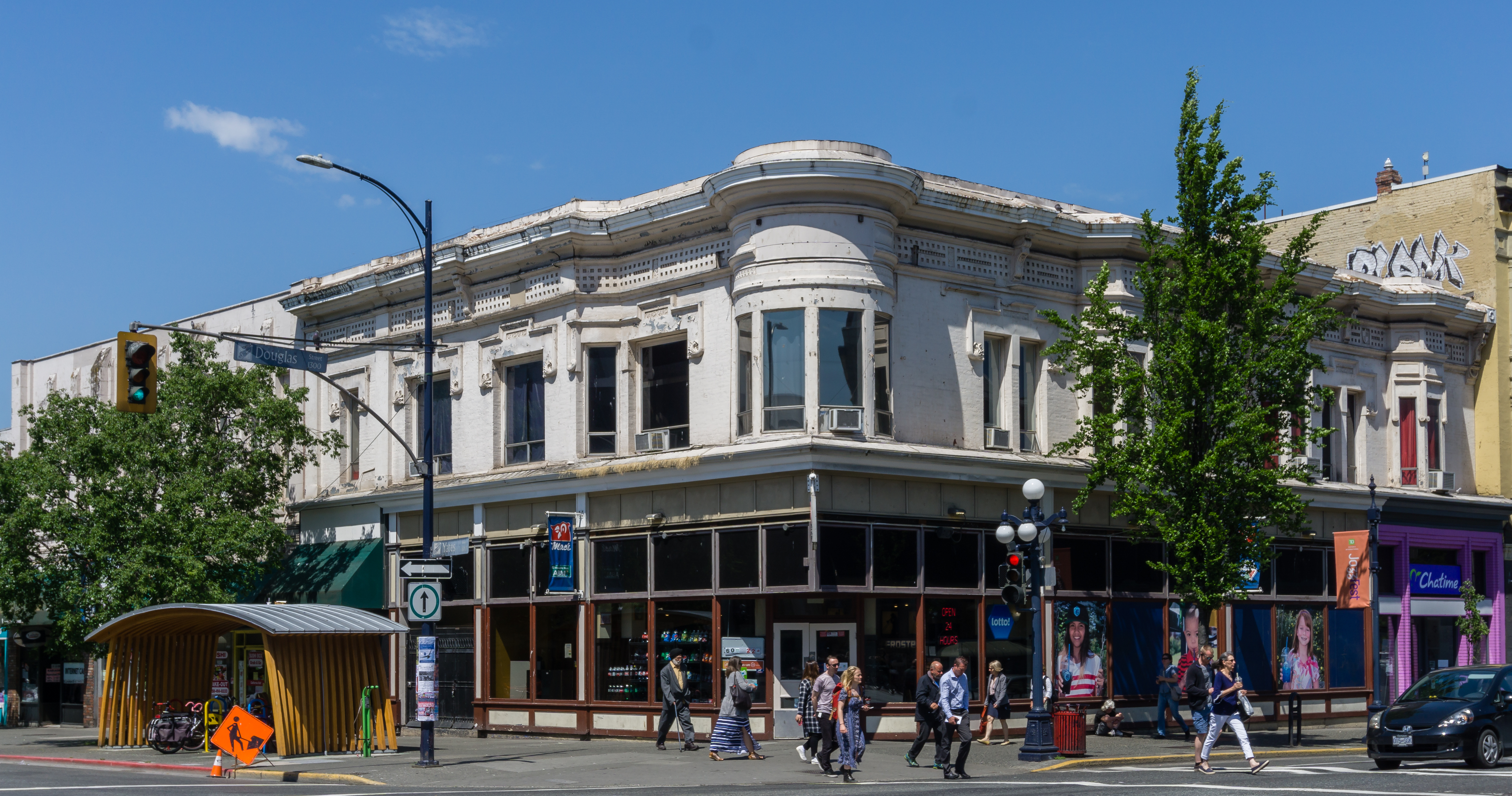
- The building's exterior in 2018
- Interactive map of the Reynolds Block area
- Alternative names: KFC Building

General information
- Location: 1300 Douglas Street, Victoria, British Columbia, Canada
- Coordinates: 48.4266°N 123.3652°W
- Completed: 1889
- Opened: 1889

Technical details
- Material: Brick, Concrete and Steel
- Floor count: 2

Reynolds Block, also known as the KFC Building, is an historic building in Victoria, British Columbia, Canada. It is a two-storey ( 3 including roof) commercial building It was completed in 1889, and it stands on the northwest corner of Douglas and Yates Sts.

== See also ==
- List of historic places in Victoria, British Columbia
