= Prior Building =

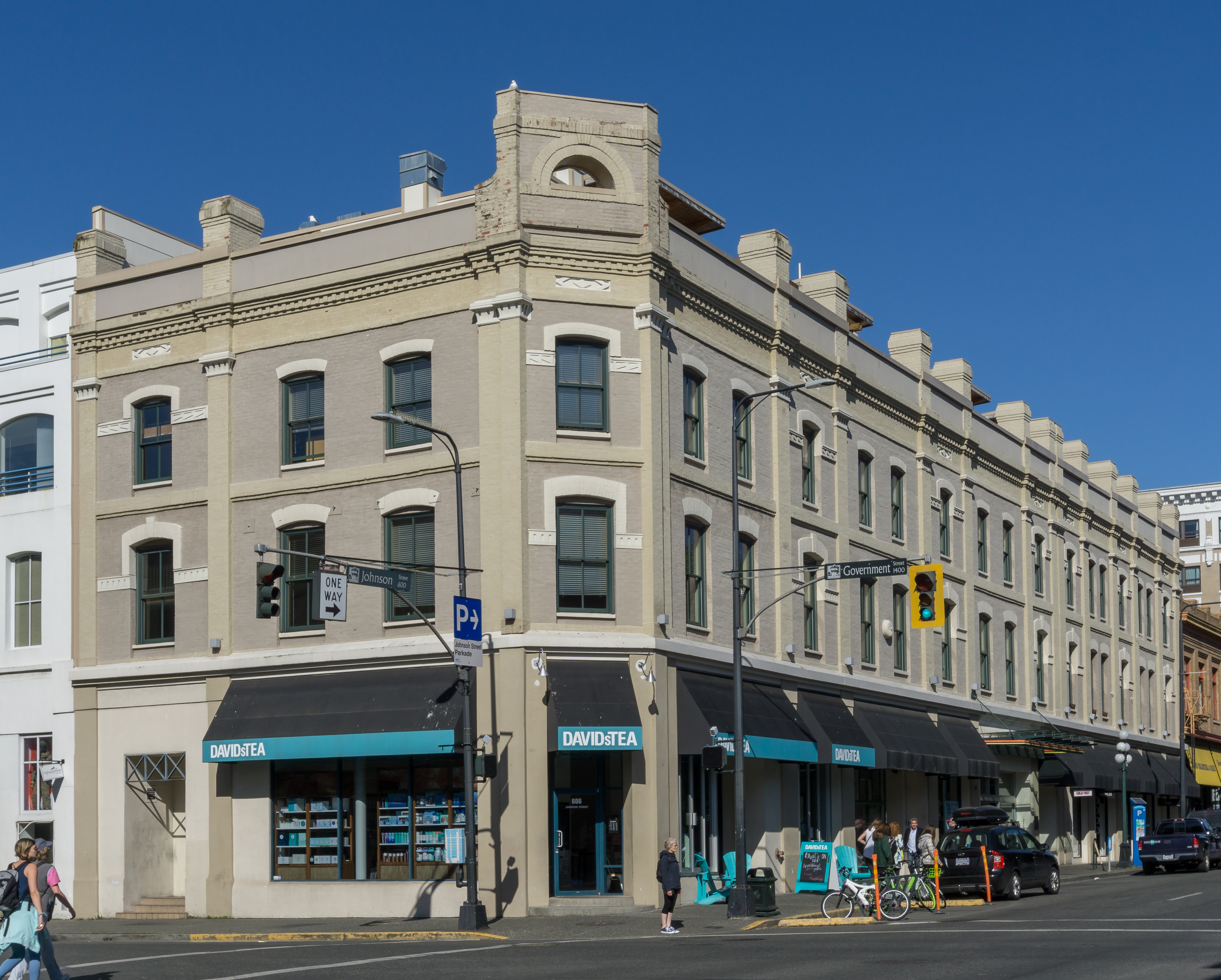
- The building's exterior in 2018
- Interactive map of the Prior Building area

General information
- Location: 1401 Government Street, Victoria, British Columbia, Canada
- Coordinates: 48.4276°N 123.3669°W
- Completed: 1888

Technical details
- Floor count: 3

The Prior Building is an historic building in Victoria, British Columbia, Canada. It is at the northeast corner of Government St. and Johnson St.

== See also ==
- List of historic places in Victoria, British Columbia
