= Robinson's Sporting Goods =

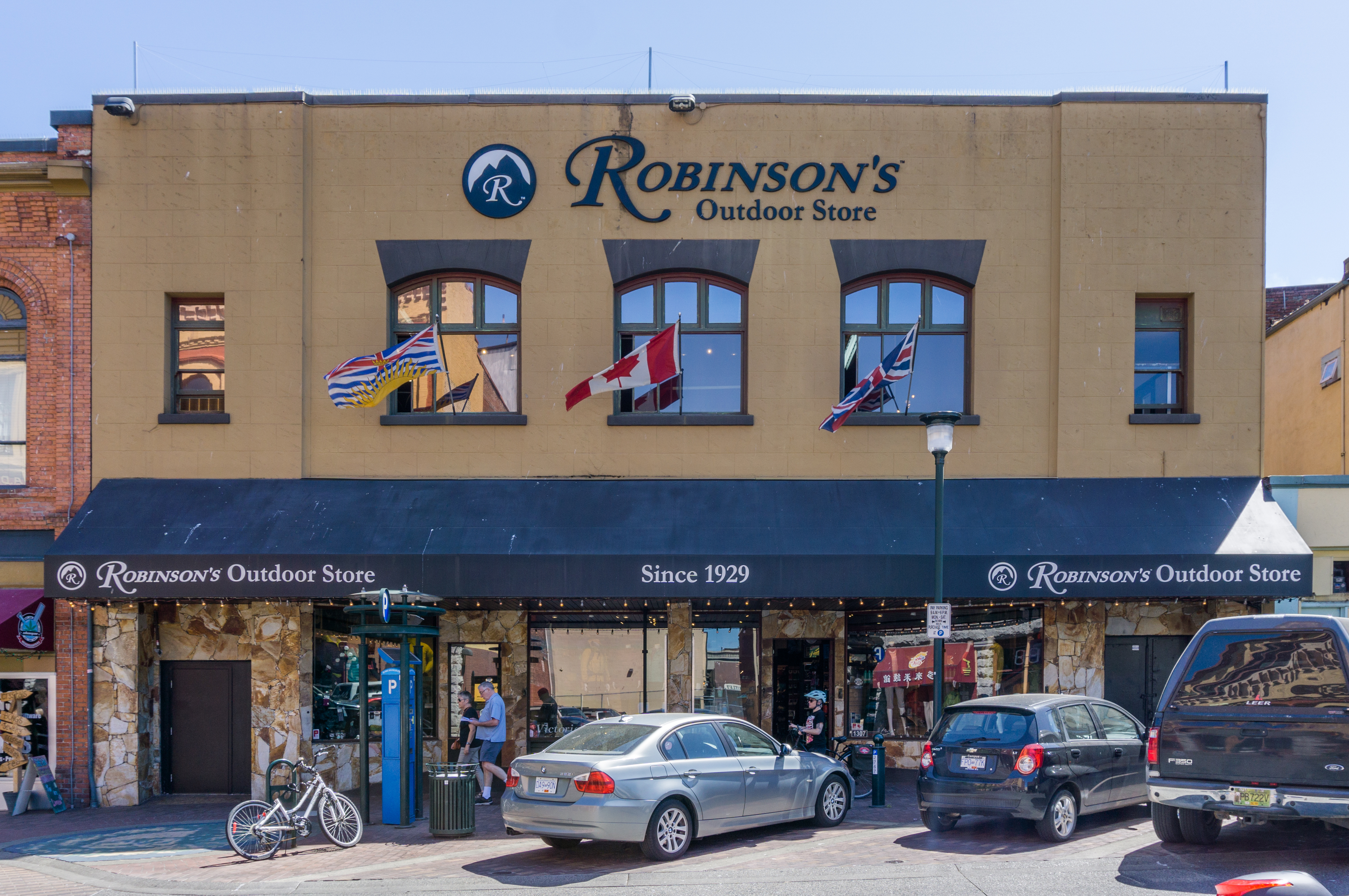
- The building's exterior in 2018
- Interactive map of the Robinson's Sporting Goods area

General information
- Location: 1307 Broad Street, Victoria, British Columbia, Canada
- Coordinates: 48.4267°N 123.3660°W

Robinson's Sporting Goods is in a historic building in Victoria, British Columbia, Canada.

== See also ==
- List of historic places in Victoria, British Columbia
