= City Hall Annex (Victoria, British Columbia) =

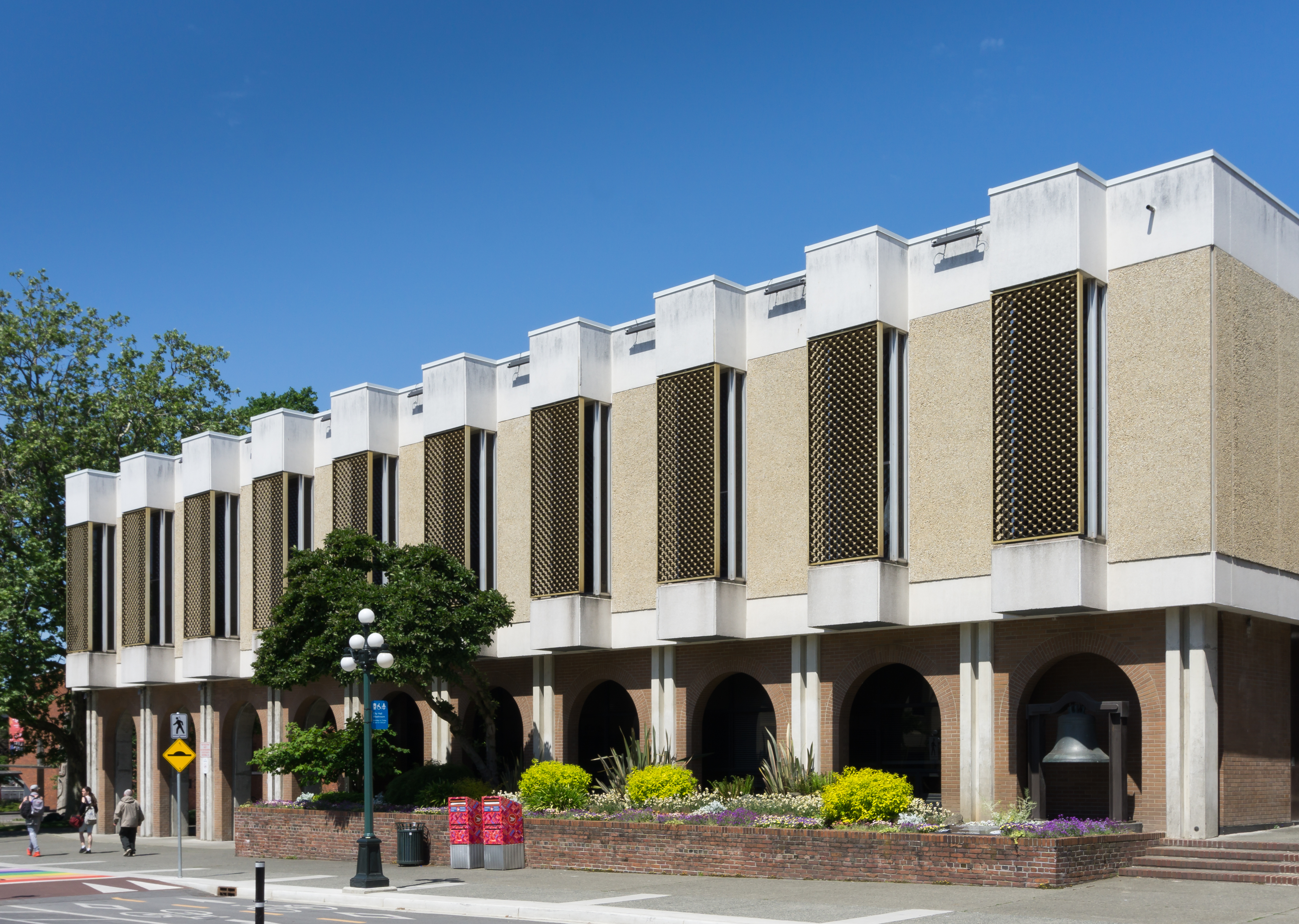
- The building's exterior in 2018
- Interactive map of the City Hall Annex area

General information
- Location: Victoria, British Columbia, Canada
- Coordinates: 48°25′42.19″N 123°21′56.54″W

City Hall Annex is an historic building in Victoria, British Columbia, Canada.

== See also ==
- List of historic places in Victoria, British Columbia
