= Montrose Apartments =

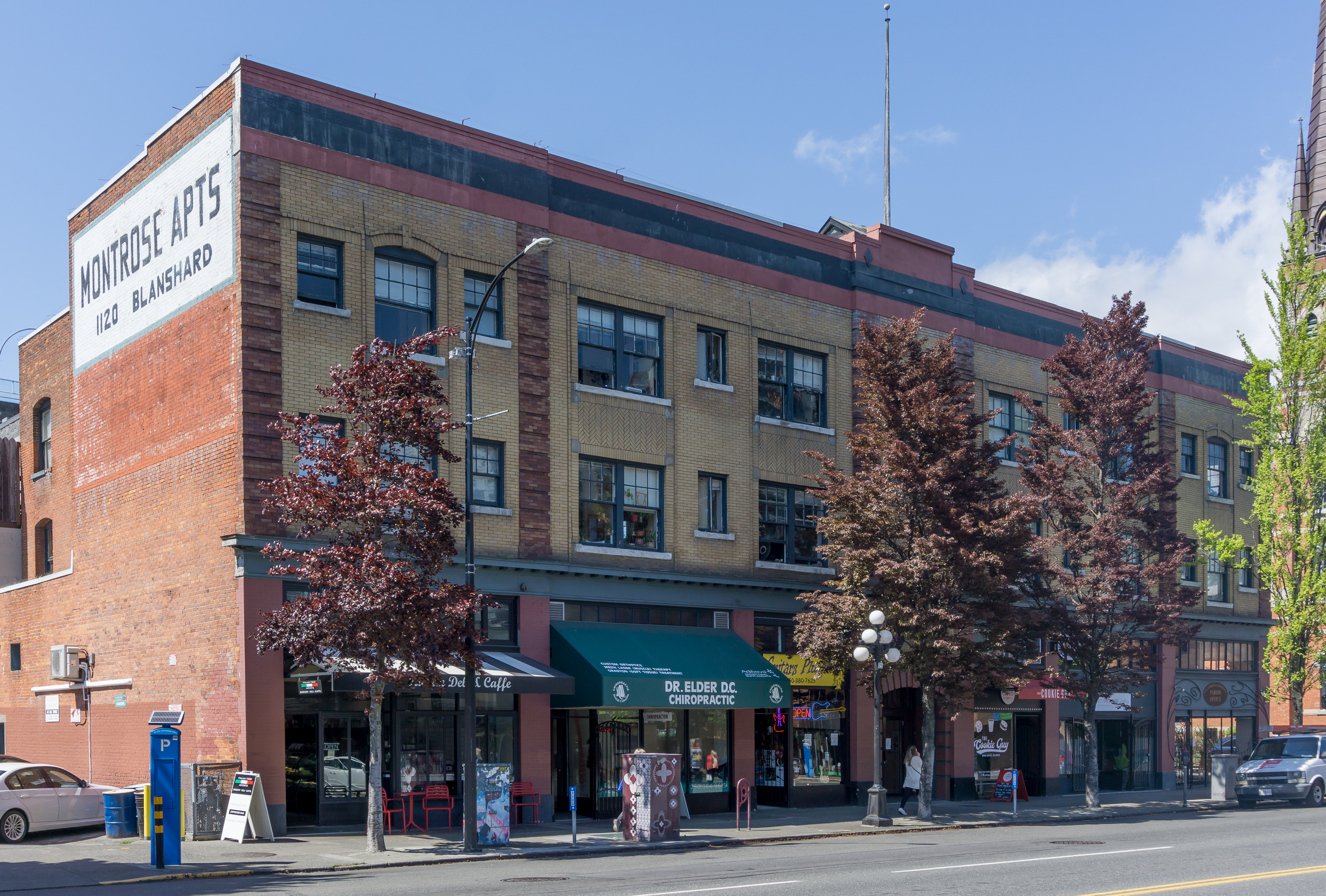
- The building's exterior in 2018
- Interactive map of the Montrose Apartments area

General information
- Location: 1114 Blanshard Street, Victoria, British Columbia, Canada
- Coordinates: 48.4249°N 123.3627°W
- Completed: 1912

The Montrose Apartments is an historic building in Victoria, British Columbia, Canada.

== See also ==
- List of historic places in Victoria, British Columbia
