= Milne Block =

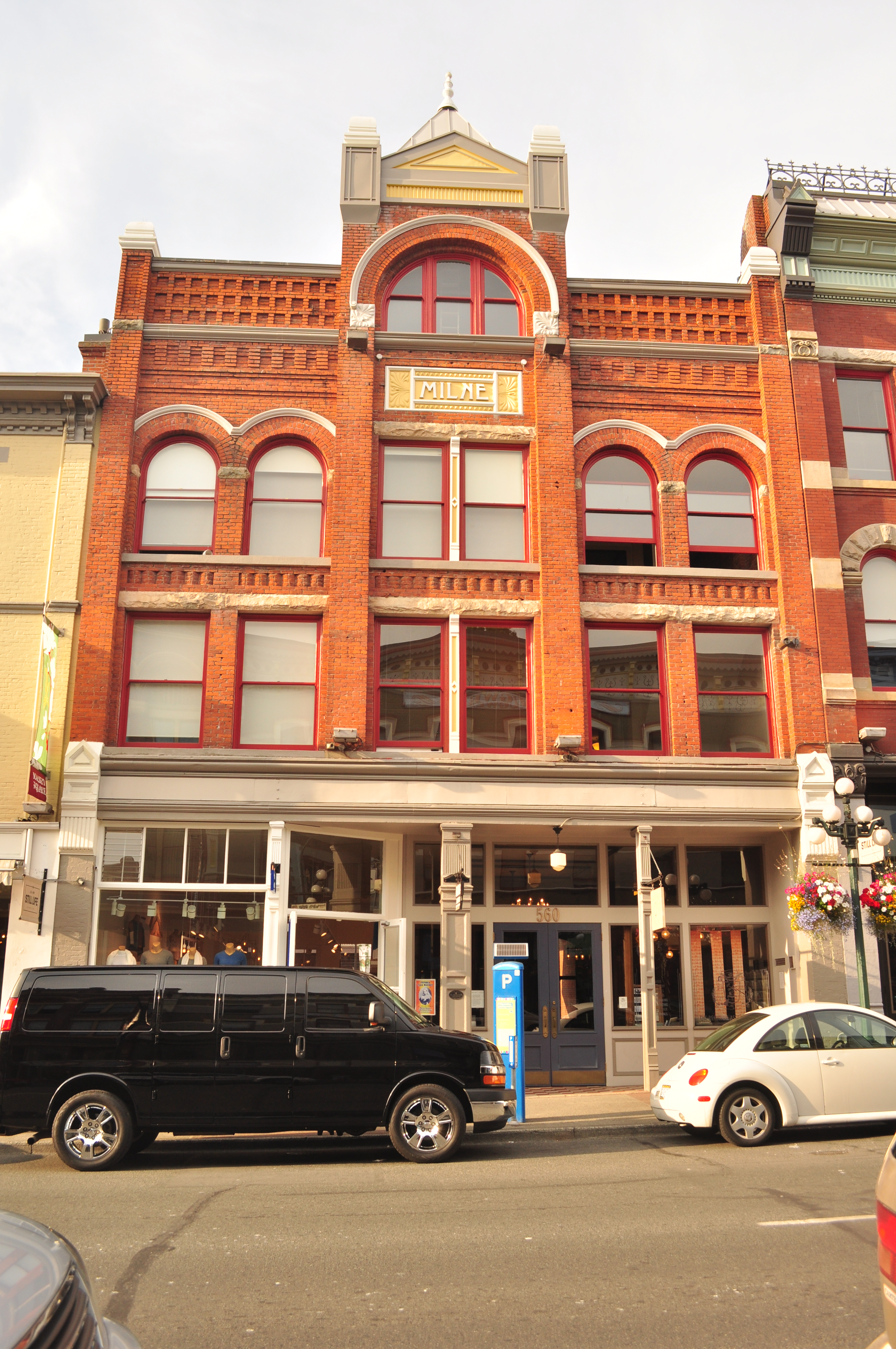
- The building's exterior in 2015
- Interactive map of the Milne Block area

General information
- Location: 546-548 Johnson Street, Victoria, British Columbia, Canada
- Coordinates: 48.4278°N 123.3689°W

Technical details
- Floor count: 4

Milne Block is an historic building in Victoria, British Columbia, Canada, located at 546-548 Johnson Street, just west of Wharf Street.

== See also ==
- List of historic places in Victoria, British Columbia
