= Burnes House =

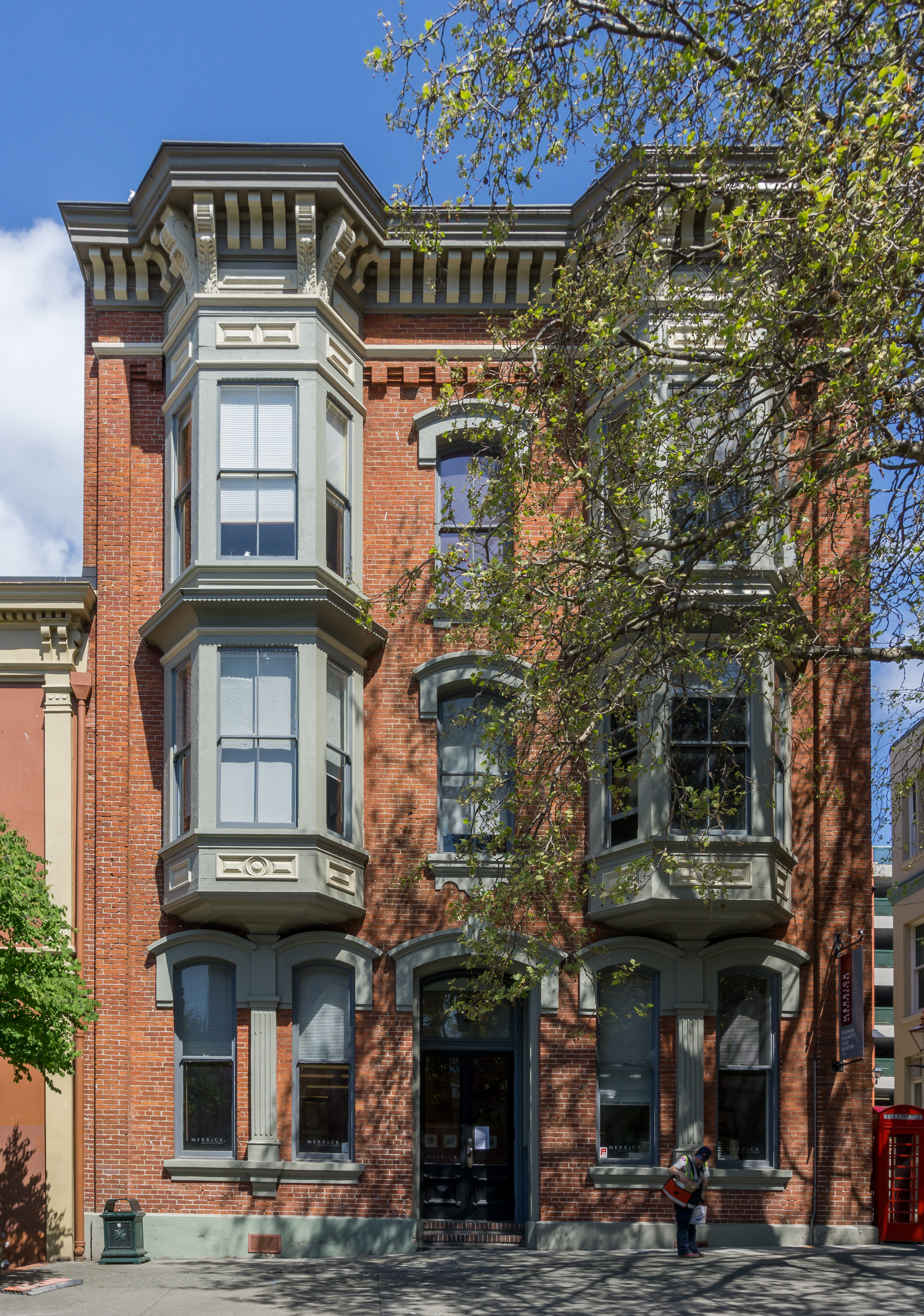
- The building's exterior in 2018
- Interactive map of the Burnes House area

General information
- Location: 18-26 Bastion Square, Victoria, British Columbia, Canada
- Coordinates: 48.42608°N 123.36925°W

The Burnes House is an historic building in Victoria, British Columbia, Canada. It is located on Bastion Square, just east of Wharf Street.

== See also ==
- List of historic places in Victoria, British Columbia
