= Lee Woy & Company Building =

Historic building in Victoria, British Columbia, Canada

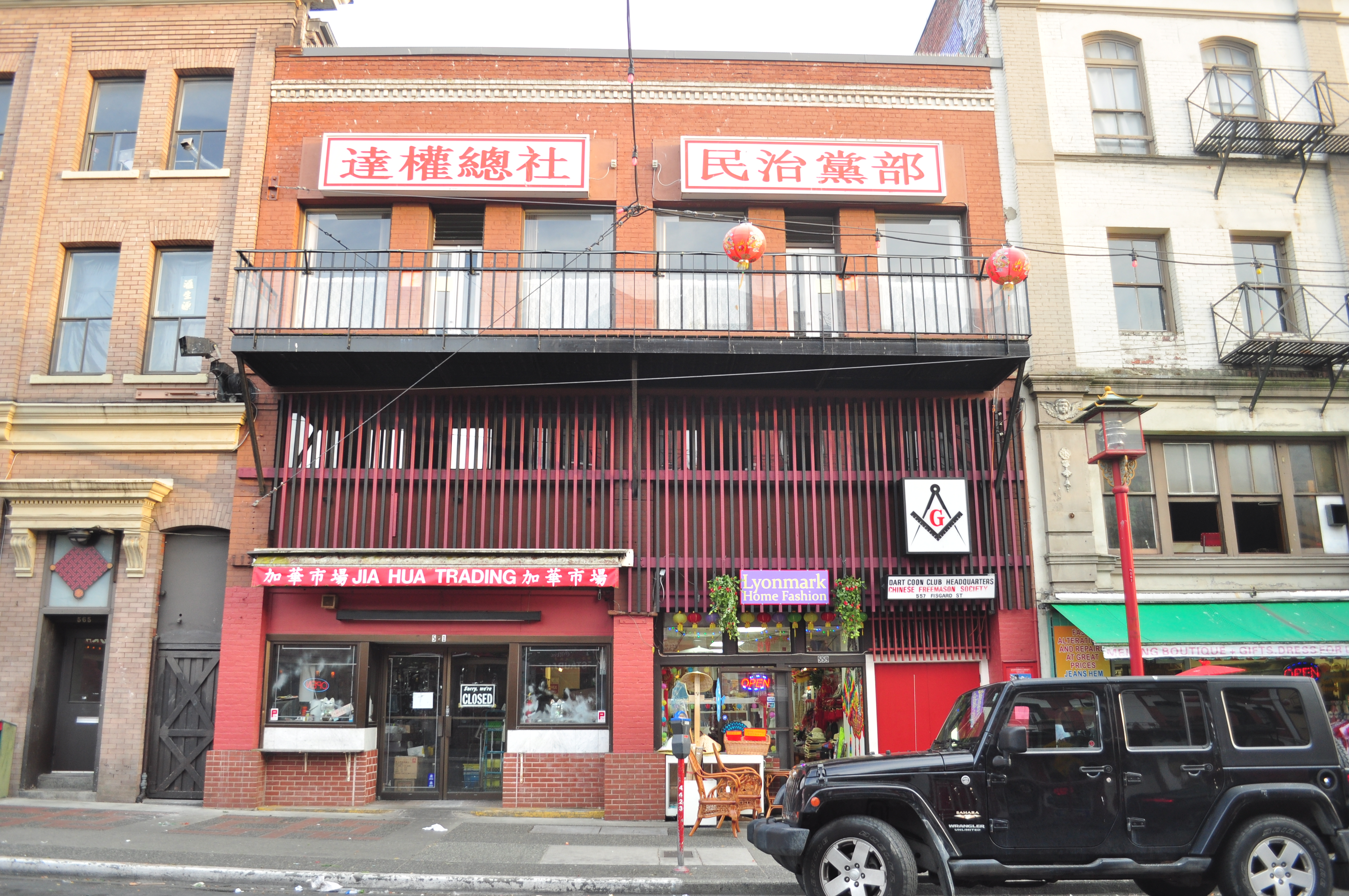
- The building's exterior in 2015
- Interactive map of the Lee Woy & Company Building area

General information
- Location: 557-561 Fisgard Street, Victoria, British Columbia, Canada
- Coordinates: 48.42921°N 123.36757°W

The Lee Woy & Company Building is an historic building in Victoria, British Columbia, Canada.

== See also ==
- List of historic places in Victoria, British Columbia
