= Gee Tuck Tong Benevolent Association Building =

Clubhouse in Victoria, British Columbia

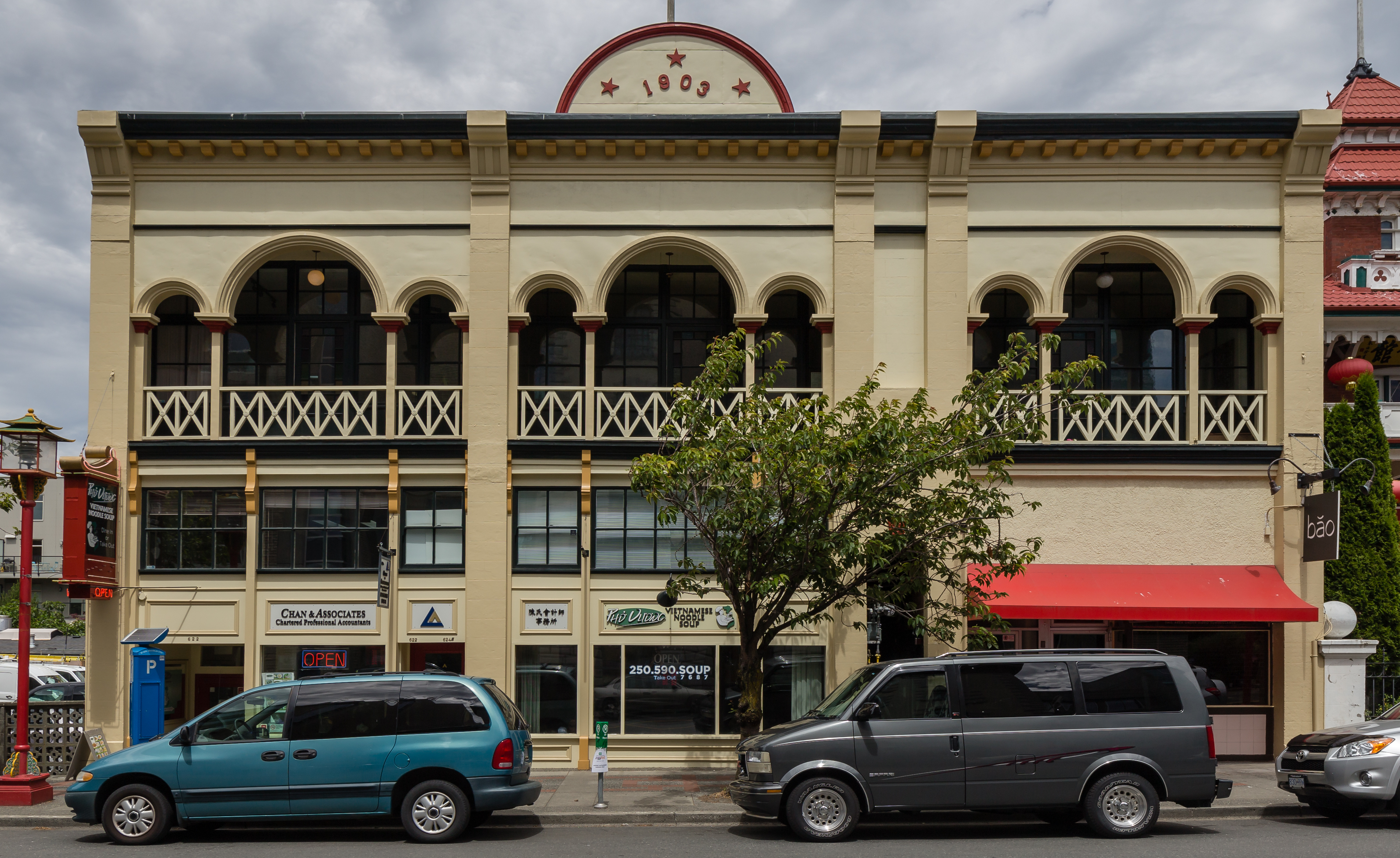
- The building's exterior in 2015
- Interactive map of the Gee Tuck Tong Benevolent Association Building area

General information
- Location: 622 - 626 Fisgard St., Victoria, British Columbia, Canada
- Coordinates: 48°25′46.351″N 123°21′57.722″W
- Opened: 1903

Technical details
- Floor count: 3

The Gee Tuck Tong Benevolent Association Building is an historic building in Victoria, British Columbia, Canada.

== See also ==
- List of historic places in Victoria, British Columbia
