= Loo Tai Cho Building =

Building in Chinatown, Victoria, BC

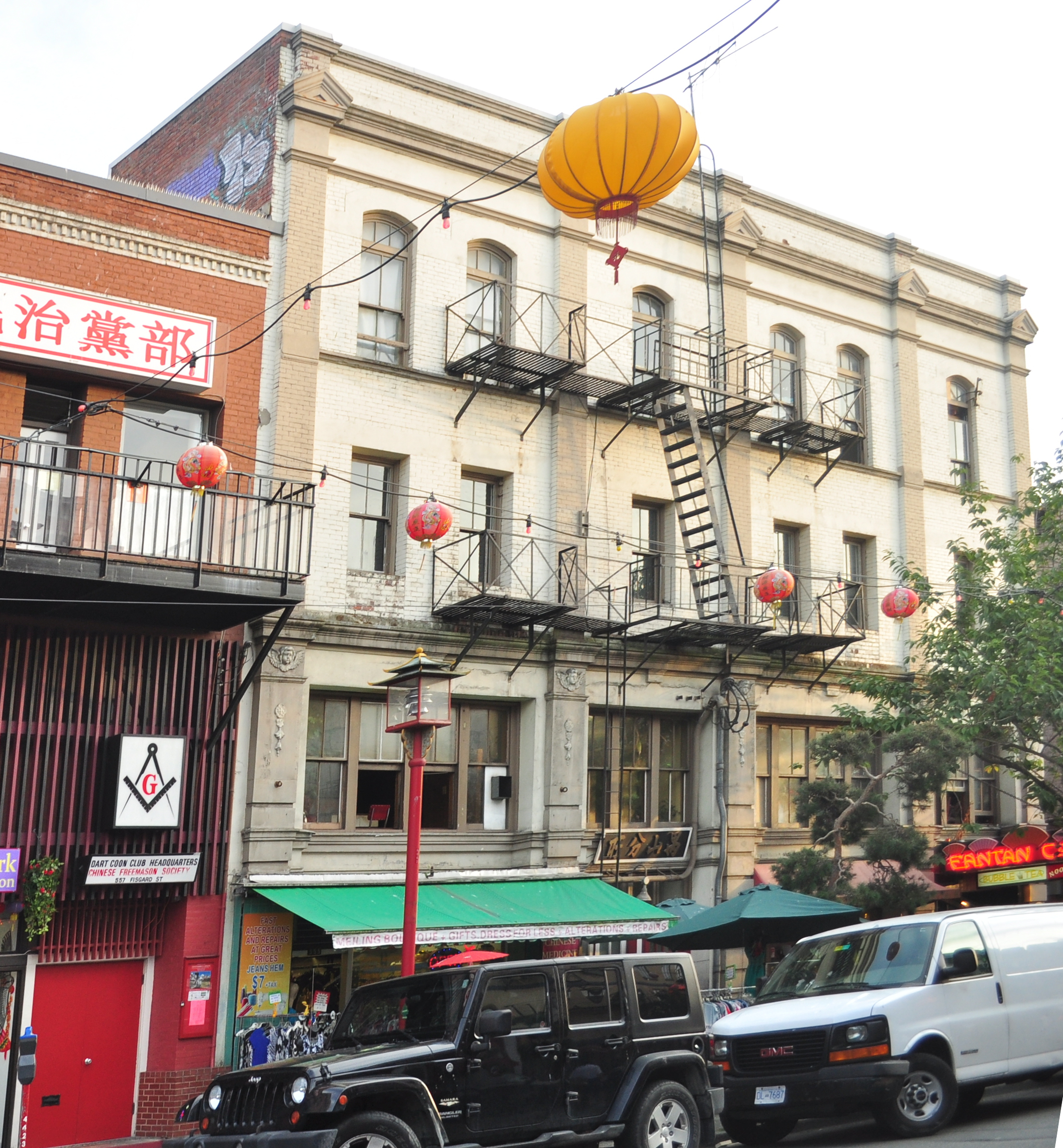
- The building's exterior in 2015
- Interactive map of the Loo Tai Cho Building area

General information
- Location: 549 Fisgard St., Victoria, British Columbia, Canada
- Coordinates: 48°25′45.044″N 123°22′4.033″W

The Loo Tai Cho Building is an historic building in Victoria, British Columbia, Canada.

== See also ==
- List of historic places in Victoria, British Columbia
