= Lim Dat Building =

Building in Victoria, British Columbia, Canada

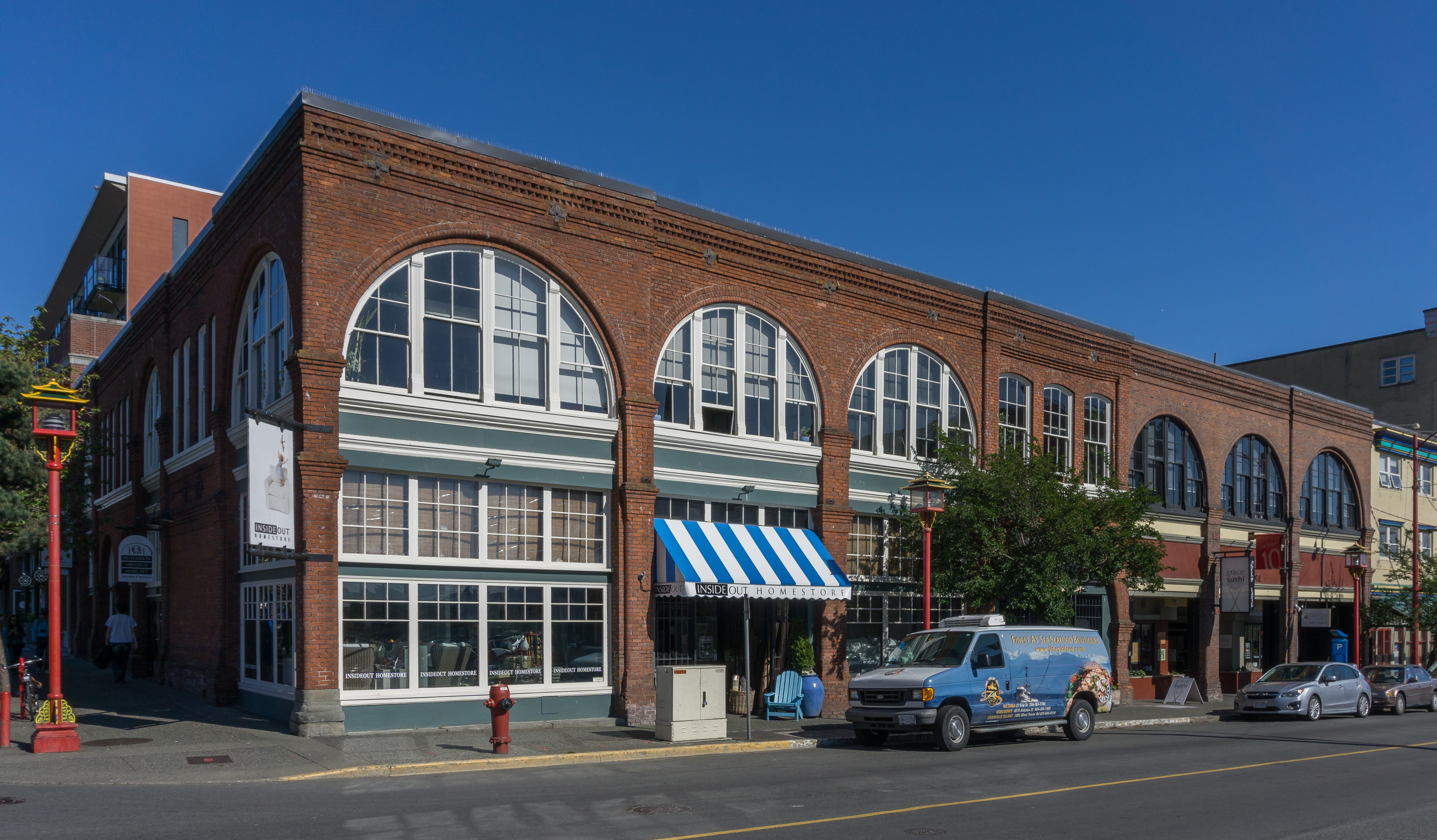
- The building's exterior in 2018
- Interactive map of the Lim Dat Building area

General information
- Location: 1617-23 Store Street, Victoria, British Columbia, Canada
- Coordinates: 48.4291°N 123.3694°W
- Completed: 1898

Technical details
- Floor count: 2

The Lim Dat Building is an historic building in Victoria, British Columbia, Canada. Built in 1898, it stands at the corner of Store and Fisgard Streets on the edge of Victoria's Chinatown area.

== See also ==
- List of historic places in Victoria, British Columbia
