= Duck's Block =

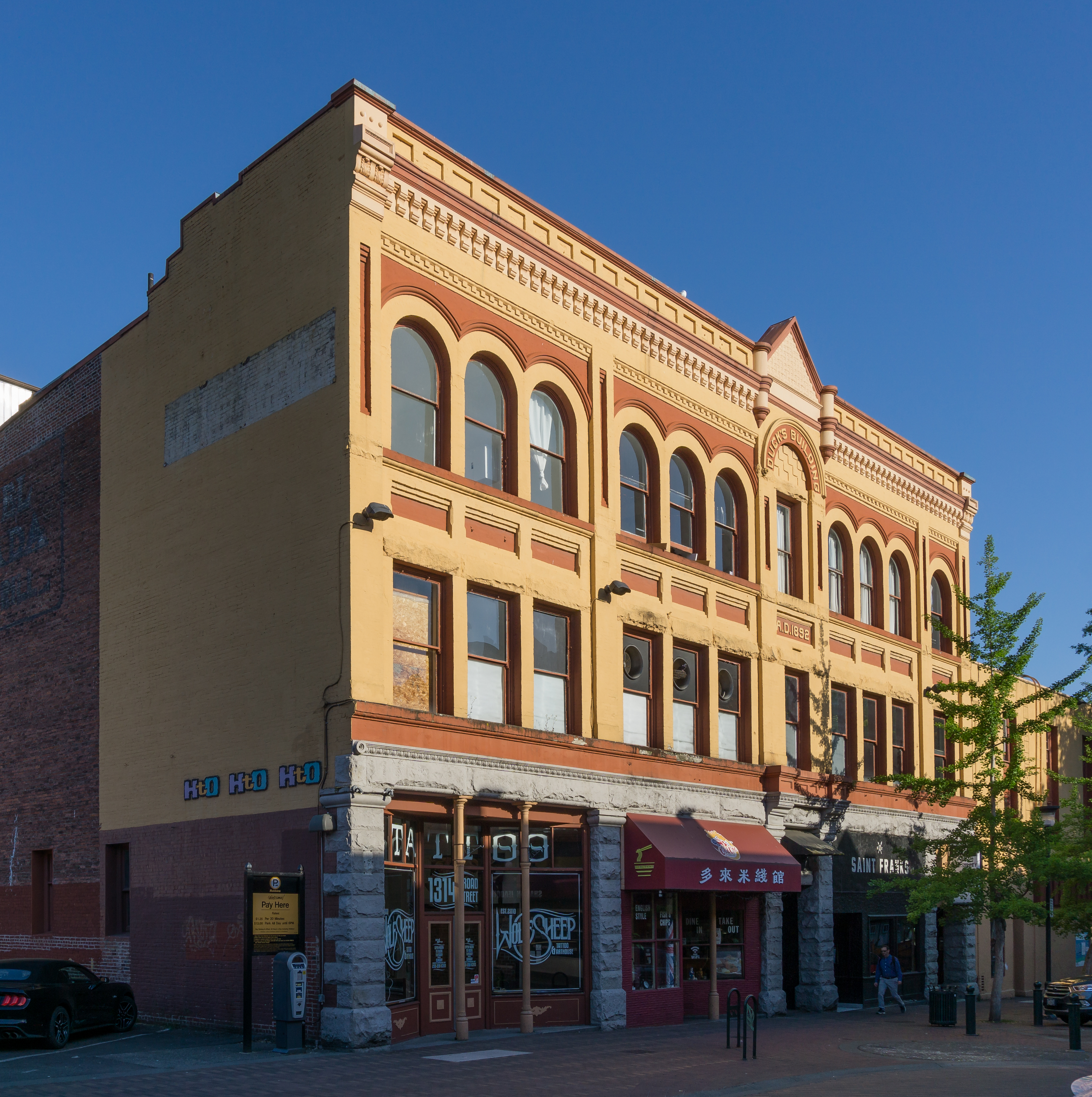
- The building's exterior in 2018
- Interactive map of the Duck's Block area

General information
- Location: 1316 Broad St., Victoria, British Columbia, Canada
- Coordinates: 48°25′37.355″N 123°21′58.968″W

Technical details
- Floor count: 3

The Duck's Block is an historic building in Victoria, British Columbia, Canada.

== See also ==
- List of historic places in Victoria, British Columbia
