= Causeway Tower and Garage =

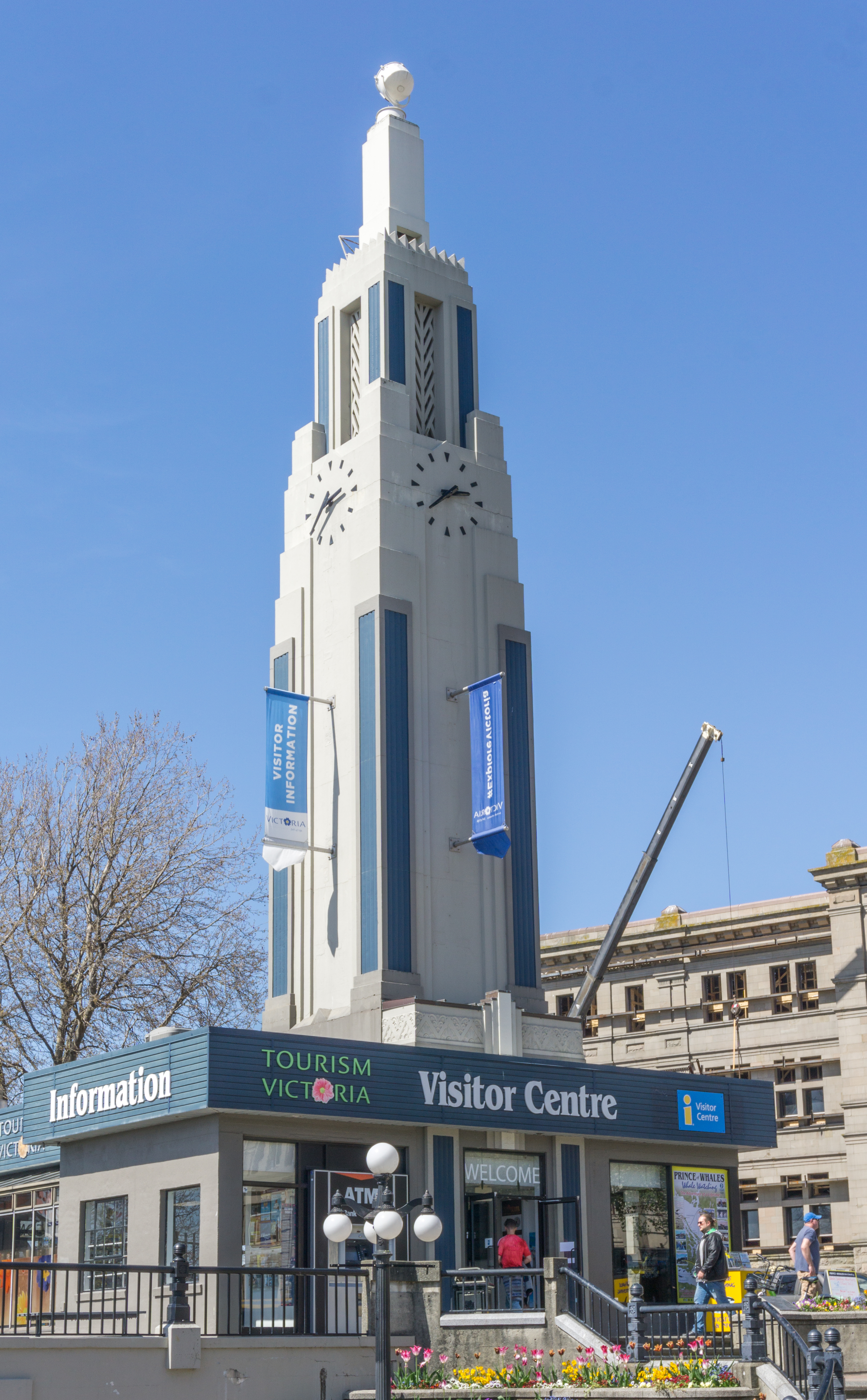
- The building's exterior in 2018
- Interactive map of the Causeway Tower and Garage area

General information
- Location: 812 Wharf Street, Victoria, British Columbia, Canada
- Coordinates: 48.4228°N 123.3689°W
- Opened: 1931

The Causeway Tower and Garage is an historic building in Victoria, British Columbia, Canada. Originally built in 1930-31 as a service centre for the Imperial Oil Company, it is now a visitors centre, gift shop and a restaurant.

== See also ==
- List of historic places in Victoria, British Columbia
