= Porter Block (Victoria, British Columbia) =

Historic building in Victoria, British Columbia, Canada

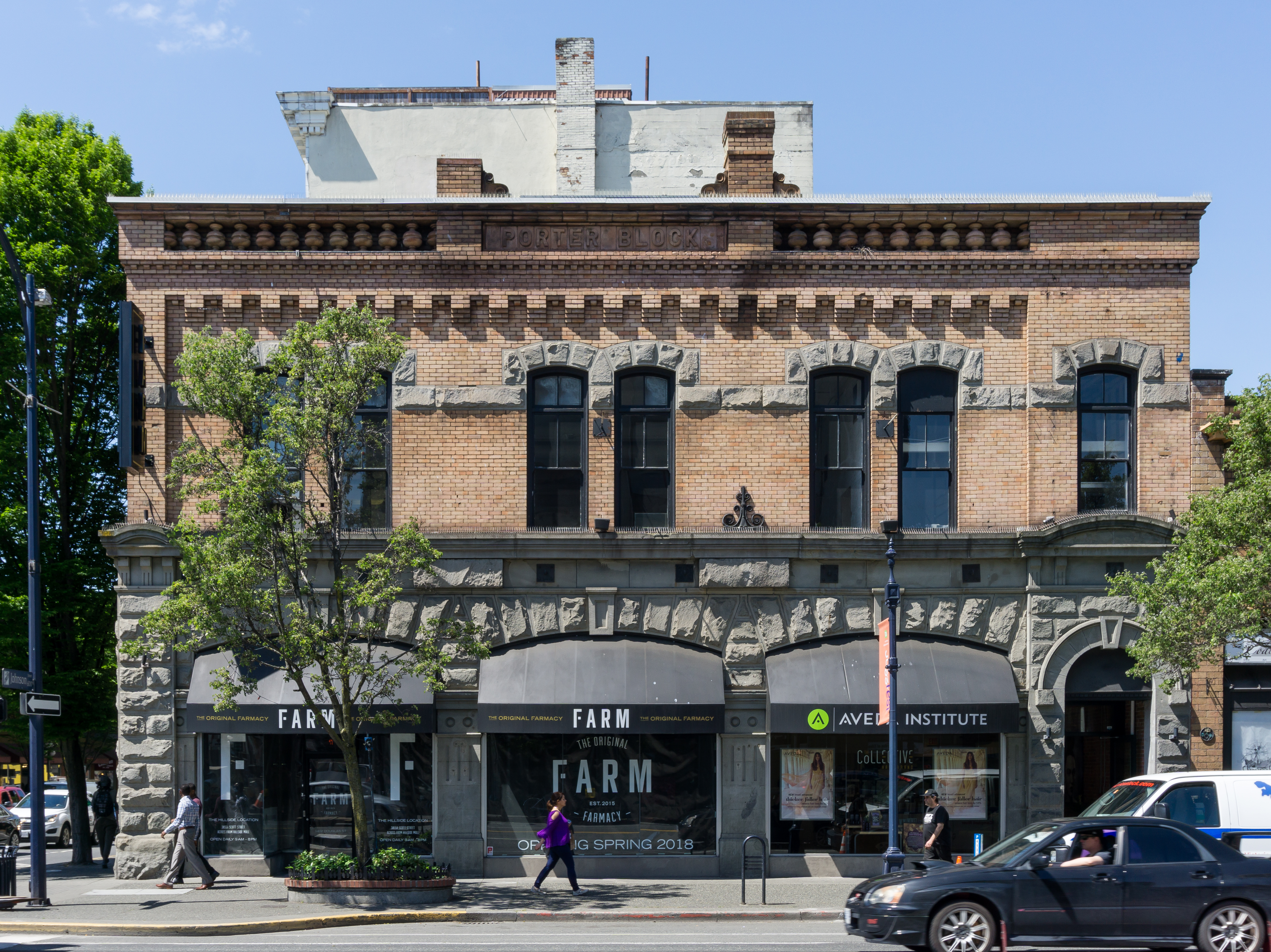
- The building's exterior in 2018
- Interactive map of the Porter Block area

General information
- Location: 1402-1406 Douglas Street, Victoria, British Columbia, Canada
- Coordinates: 48.4274°N 123.3649°W

The Porter Block is an historic building in Victoria, British Columbia, Canada. Built in 1900, it is located at the northwest corner of Douglas and Johnson Streets.

== See also ==
- List of historic places in Victoria, British Columbia
