= Mable Carriage Works =

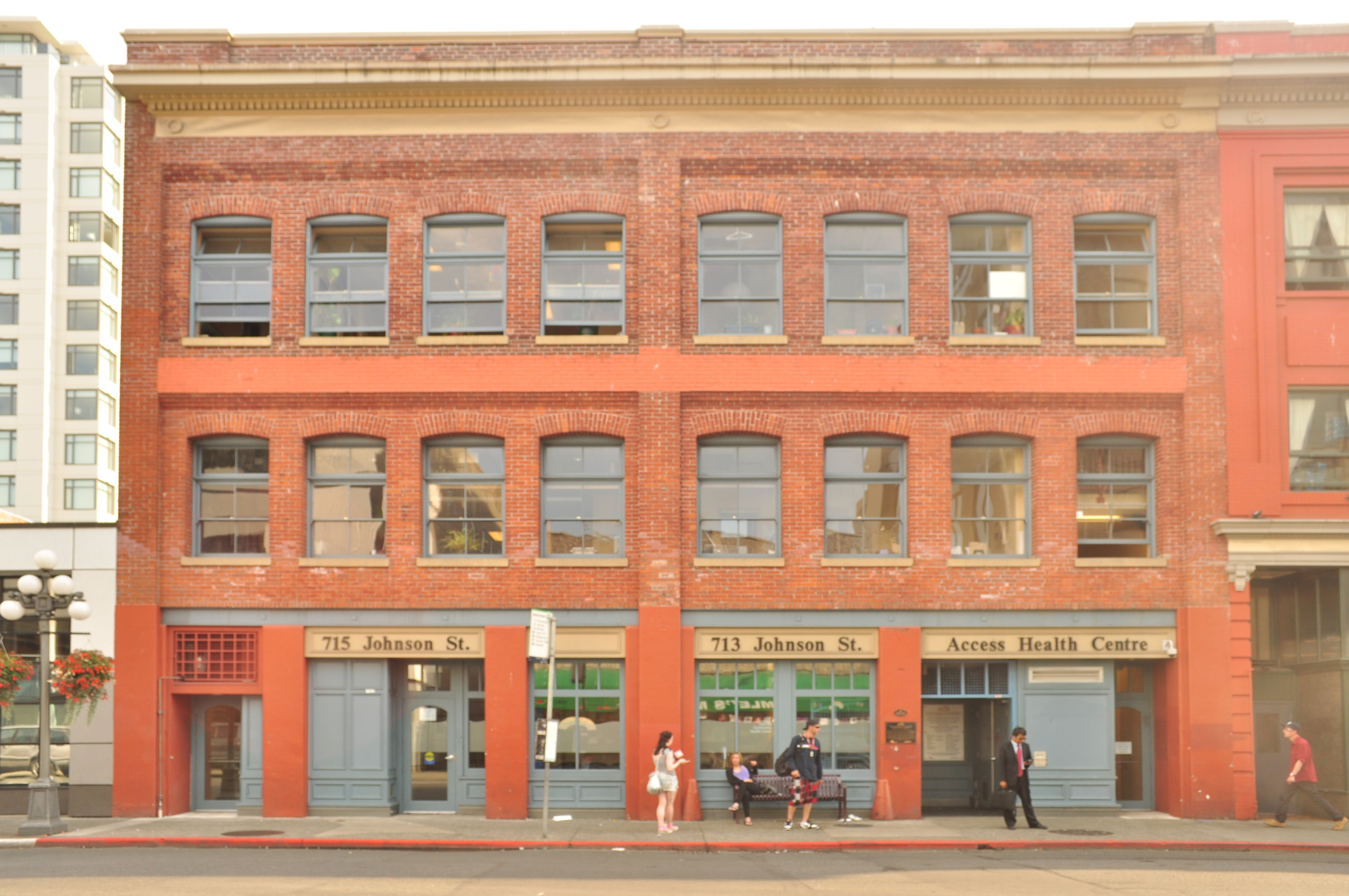
- The building's exterior in 2015
- Interactive map of the Mable Carriage Works area

General information
- Location: 713 Johnson Str., Victoria, British Columbia, Canada
- Coordinates: 48°25′36.786″N 123°21′50.278″W

Mable Carriage Works is an historic building in Victoria, British Columbia, Canada.

== See also ==
- List of historic places in Victoria, British Columbia
