= Hanna's Undertaking Parlour =

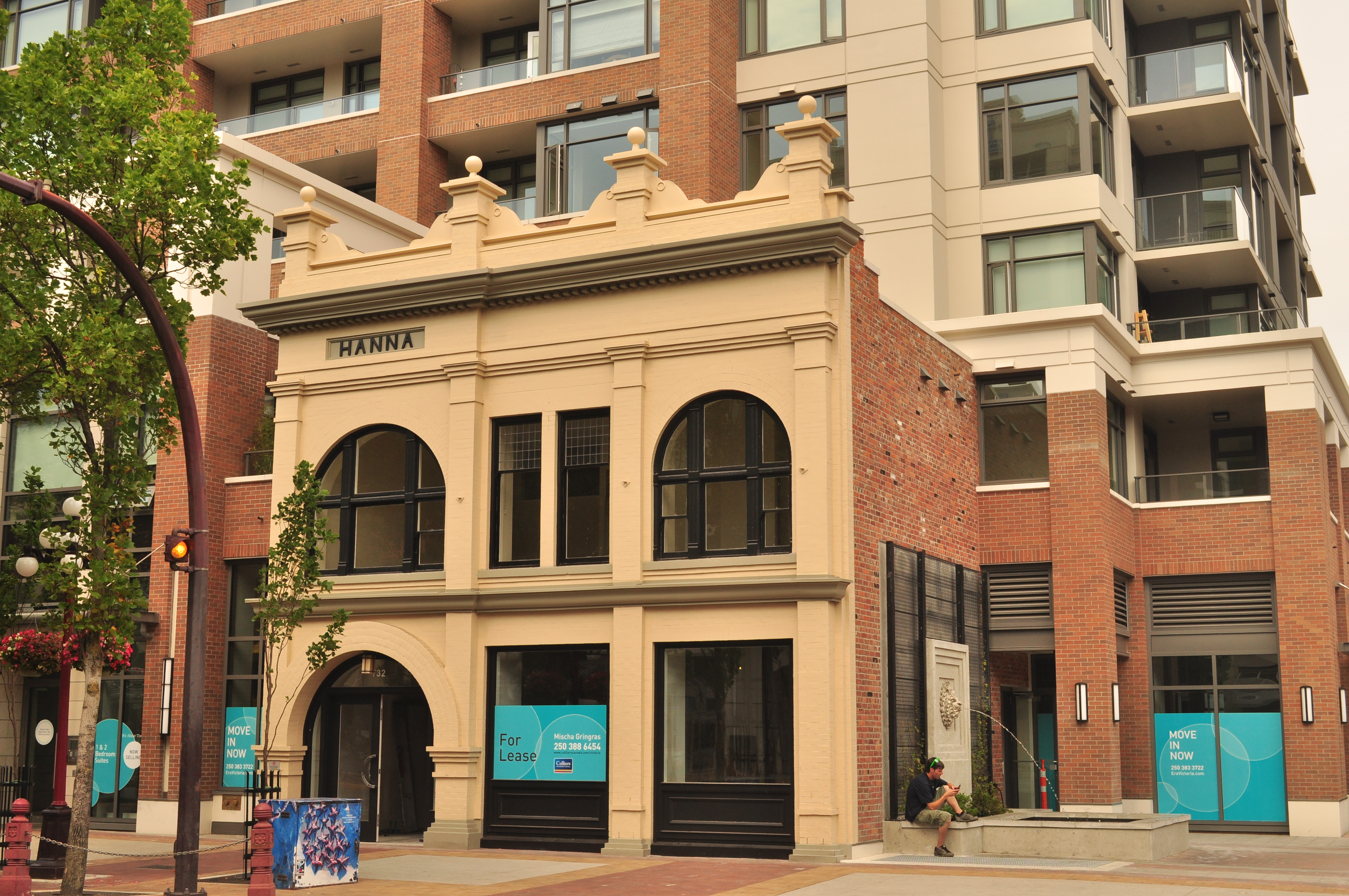
- The building's exterior in 2015
- Interactive map of the Hanna's Undertaking Parlour area

General information
- Location: 732 Yates St., Victoria, British Columbia, Canada
- Coordinates: 48°25′34.658″N 123°21′47.815″W

Hanna's Undertaking Parlour is an historic building in Victoria, British Columbia, Canada.

== See also ==
- List of historic places in Victoria, British Columbia
