= Chinese Consolidated Benevolent Association Building =

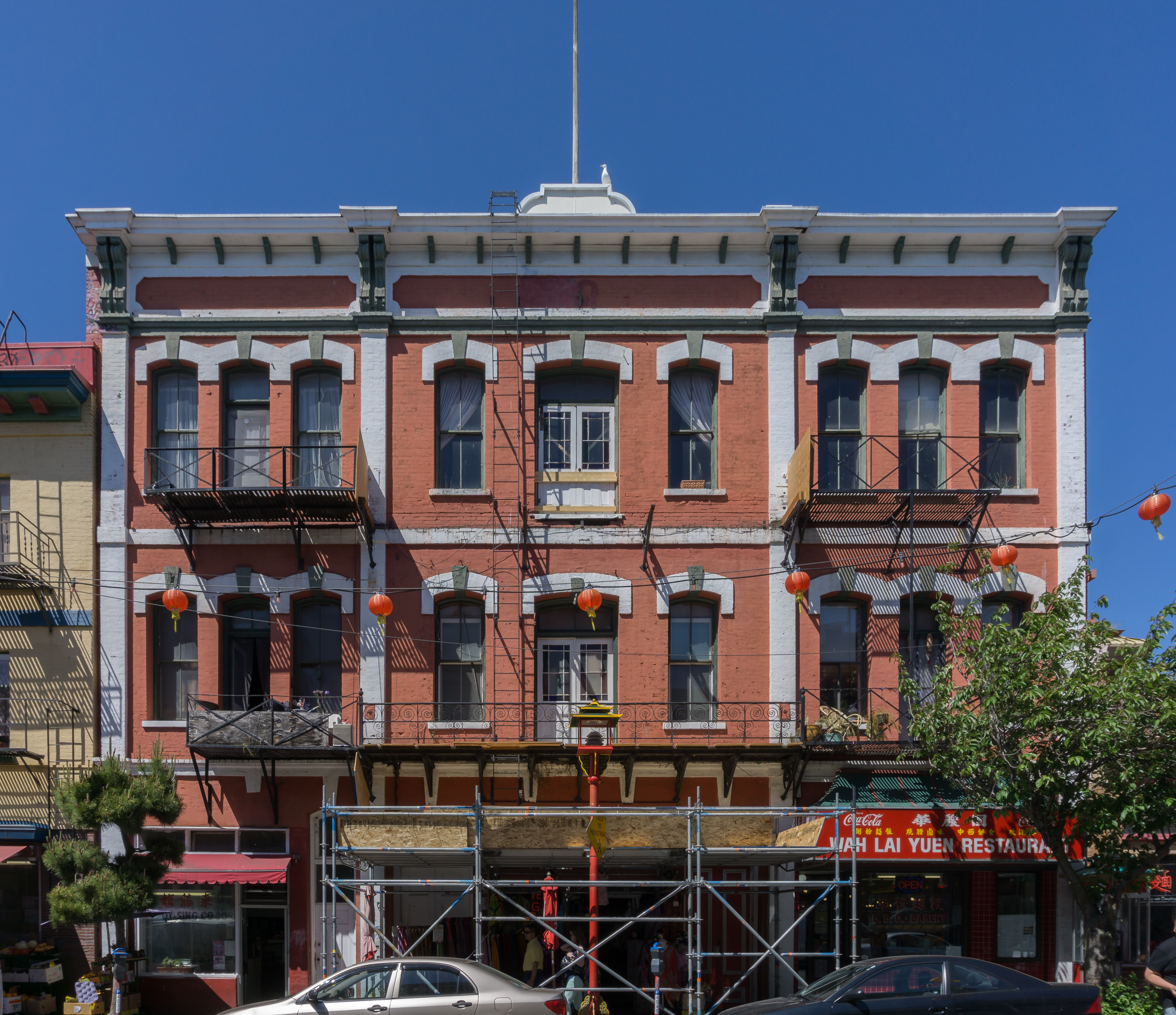
- The building's exterior in 2018
- Interactive map of the Chinese Consolidated Benevolent Association Building area

General information
- Location: Victoria, British Columbia, Canada
- Coordinates: 48°25′46.326″N 123°22′3.511″W
- Topped-out: 1885
- Completed: 1900
- Opened: 1900

Technical details
- Floor count: 4

The Chinese Consolidated Benevolent Association Building is an historic building in Chinatown Victoria, British Columbia, Canada.

== See also ==
- List of historic places in Victoria, British Columbia
