= Pacific Transfer Building =

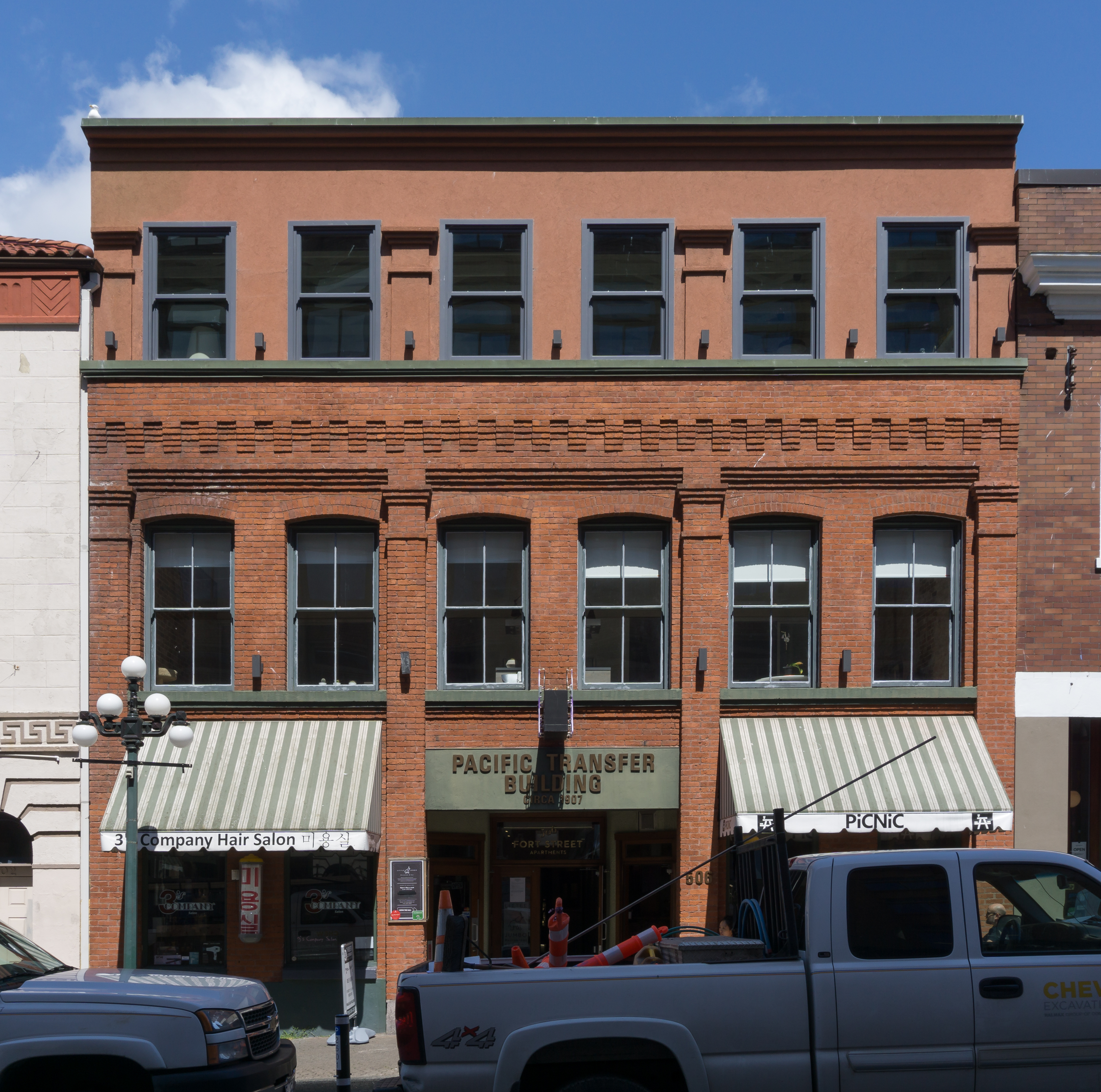
- The building's exterior in 2018
- Interactive map of the Pacific Transfer Building area

General information
- Location: 506 Fort St., Victoria, British Columbia, Canada
- Coordinates: 48.4252°N 123.3693°W

The Pacific Transfer Building is an historic building in Victoria, British Columbia, Canada. It was owned by The Pacific Transfer Company, a company that offered express deliveries within the City of Victoria and was key in the distribution of goods arriving by ship and rail.

== See also ==
- List of historic places in Victoria, British Columbia
