= Morley's Soda Water Factory =

Industrial building in Victoria, British Columbia

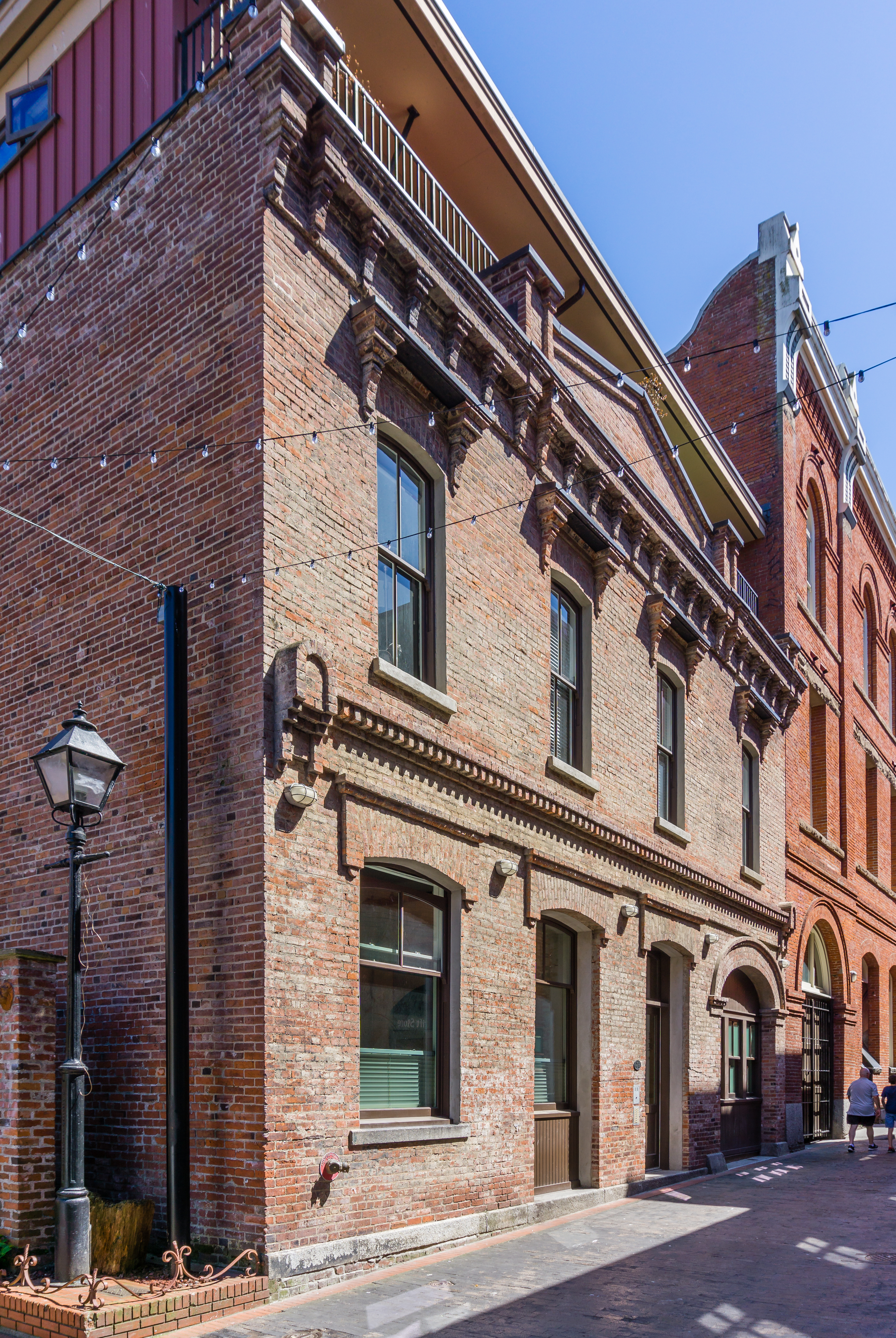
- The building's exterior in 2018
- Interactive map of the Morley's Soda Water Factory area

General information
- Location: 1315 Waddington Alley, Victoria, British Columbia, Canada
- Coordinates: 48.4274°N 123.3694°W

Morley's Soda Water Factory is an historic building in Victoria, British Columbia, Canada. It is one of the few industrial buildings in the Old Town District to survive the 1880s.

== See also ==
- List of historic places in Victoria, British Columbia
