= New England Hotel =

Historic building in Victoria, British Columbia, Canada

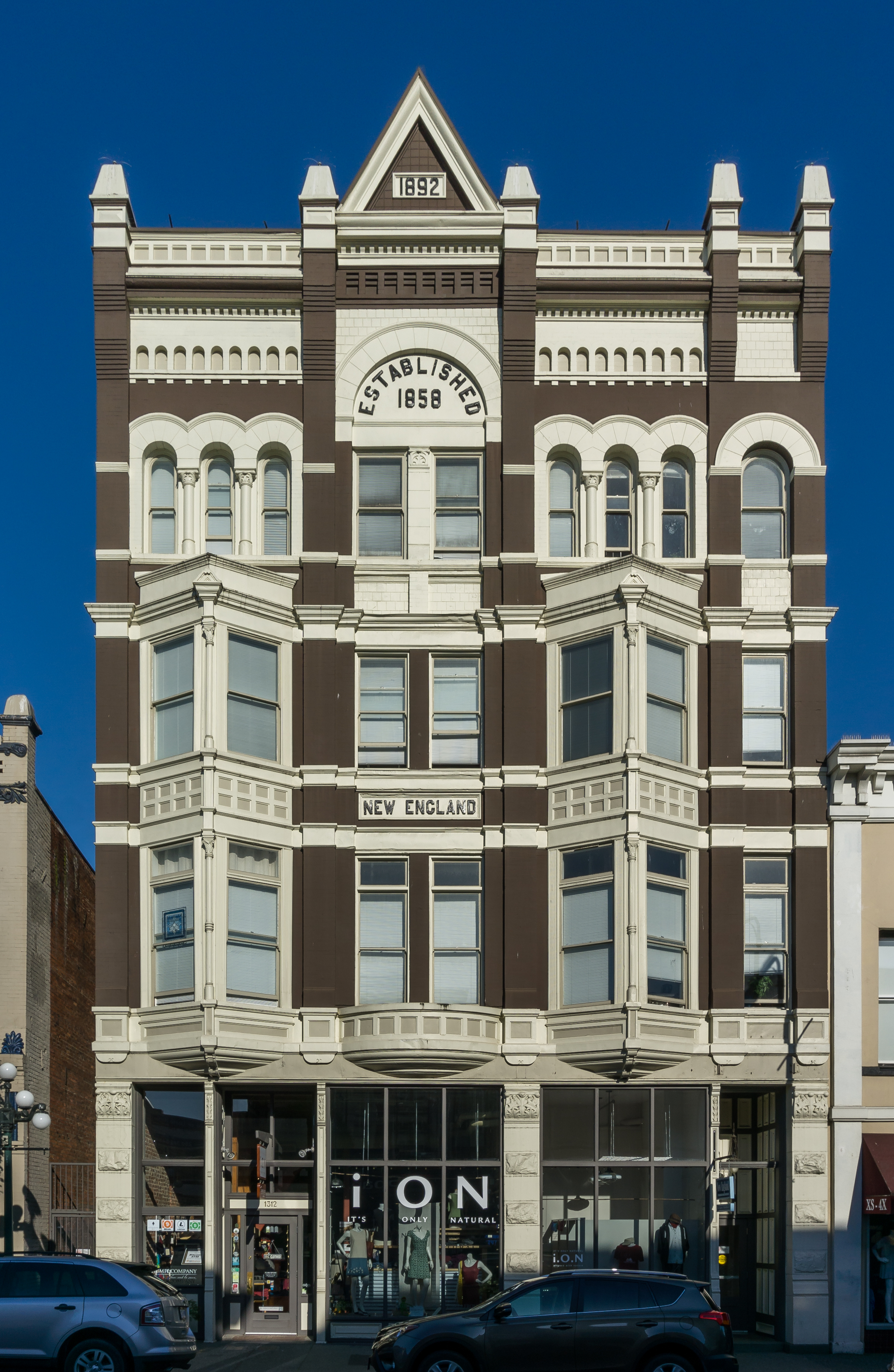
- The building's exterior in May 2018
- Interactive map of the New England Hotel area

General information
- Location: 1312-1314 Government Street, Victoria, British Columbia, Canada
- Coordinates: 48.4270°N 123.3676°W

The New England Hotel is an historic building in Victoria, British Columbia, Canada.

== See also ==
- List of historic places in Victoria, British Columbia
