= Lewis & Humphreys Block =

Historic building in Victoria, British Columbia, Canada

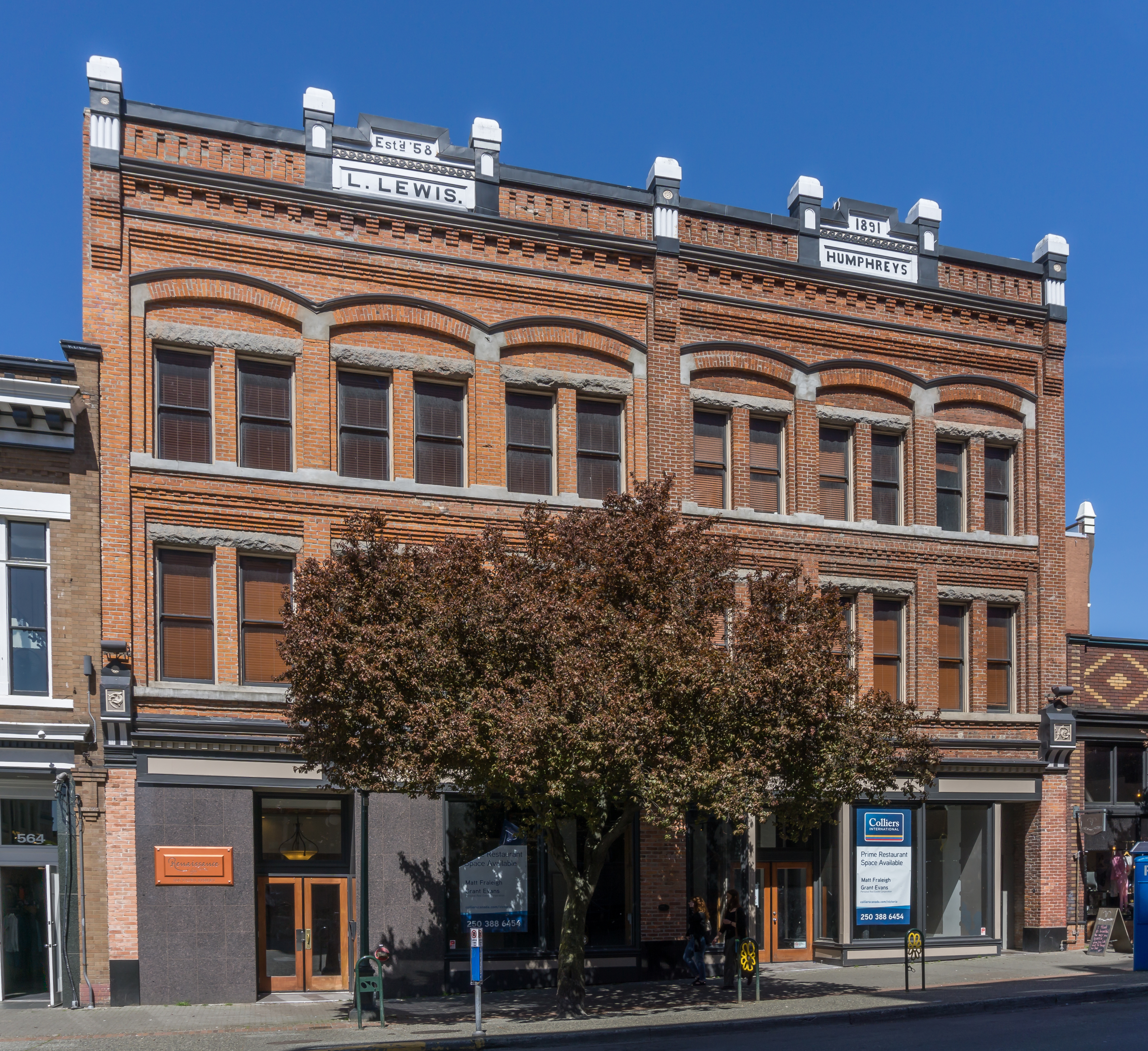
- The building's exterior in 2018
- Interactive map of the Lewis & Humphreys Block area

General information
- Location: 566-570 Yates Street, Victoria, British Columbia, Canada
- Coordinates: 48.4269°N 123.3680°W
- Completed: 1891
- Opened: 1891

Technical details
- Floor count: 3

Lewis & Humphreys Block is a historic building in Victoria, British Columbia, Canada. Originally separate, they were constructed in 1891 on lower Yates Street.The buildings were constructed during a late-19th-century development boom in Victoria following completion of the Esquimalt and Nanaimo Railway in 1888.

The building was formally recognized as a heritage property by the City of Victoria on 26 July 1990 and was later listed on the Canadian Register of Historic Places in 2009.

== See also ==
- List of historic places in Victoria, British Columbia
