= Doane Block =

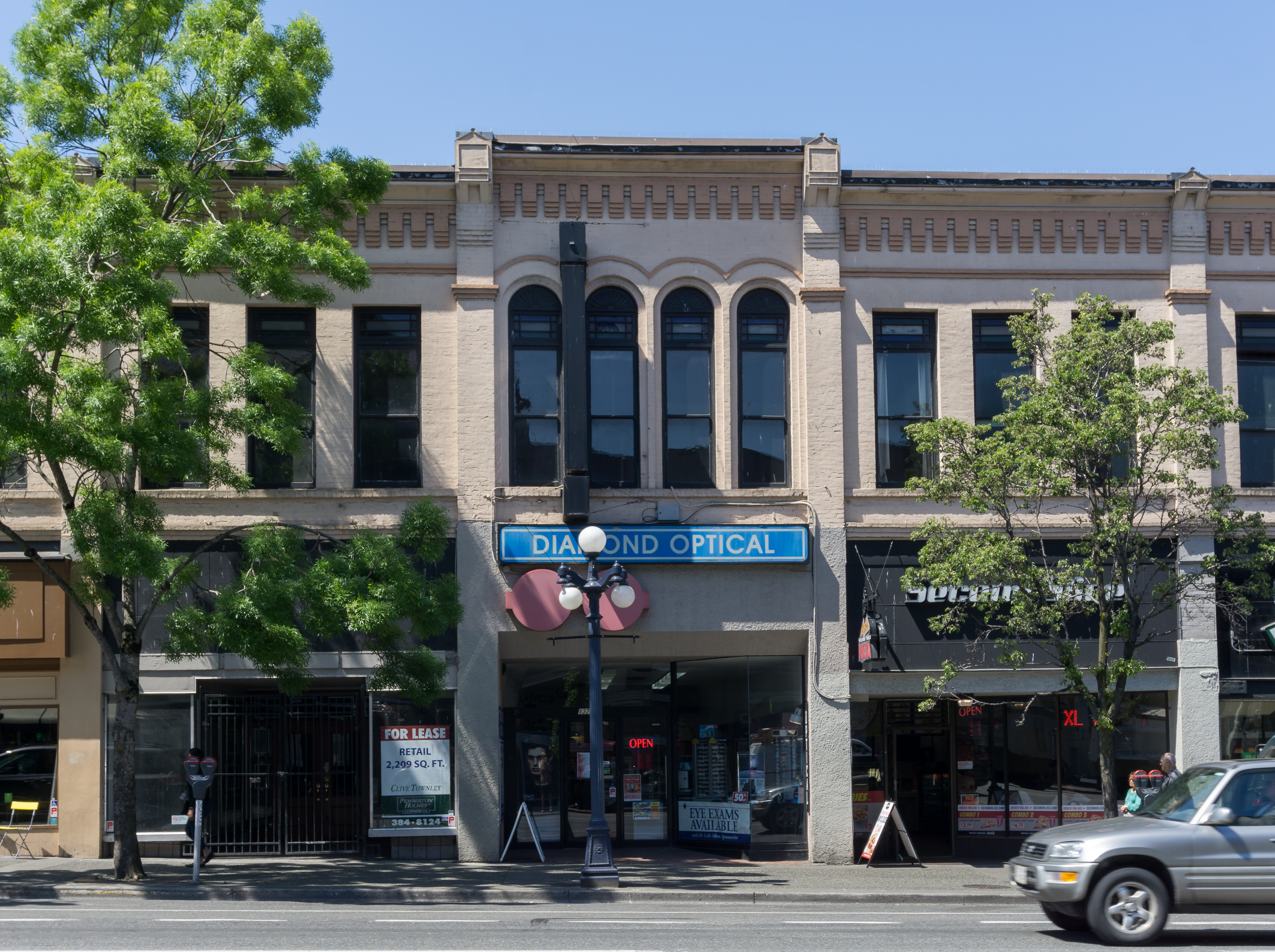
- The building's exterior in 2018
- Interactive map of the Doane Block area

General information
- Location: 1314 - 1324 Douglas St., Victoria, British Columbia, Canada
- Coordinates: 48°25′37.027″N 123°21′54.410″W

The Doane Block is a historic building in Victoria, British Columbia, Canada.

== See also ==
- List of historic places in Victoria, British Columbia
