= Alexandra Ladies' Club =

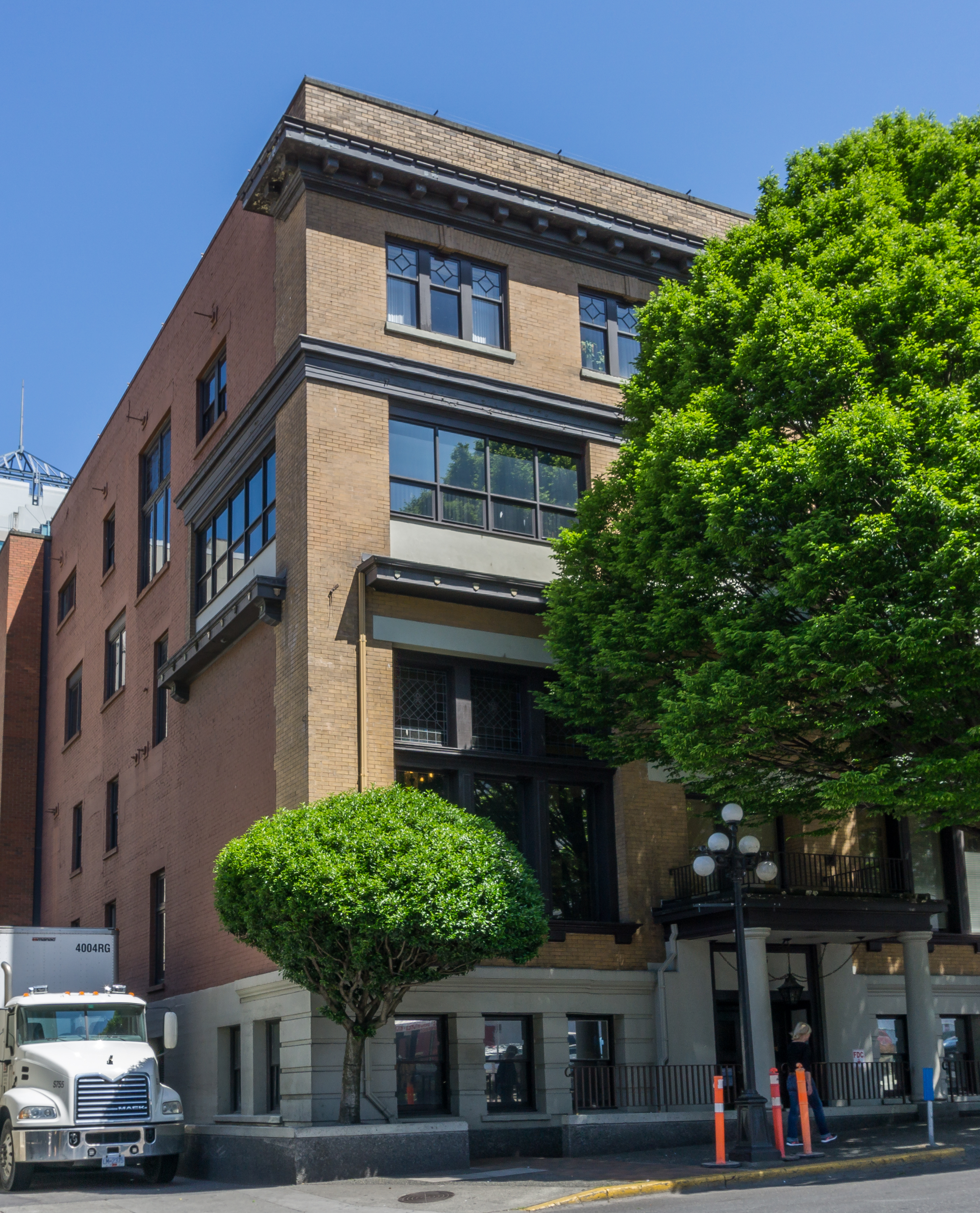
- The building's exterior in 2018
- Interactive map of the Alexandra Ladies' Club area

General information
- Location: 716 Courtney Street, Victoria, British Columbia, Canada
- Coordinates: 48.4231°N 123.3649°W
- Completed: 1911

The Alexandra Ladies' Club is an historic building in Victoria, British Columbia, Canada.

== See also ==
- List of historic places in Victoria, British Columbia
