= Hook Sin Tong Charity Building =

Building in Victoria, British Columbia, Canada

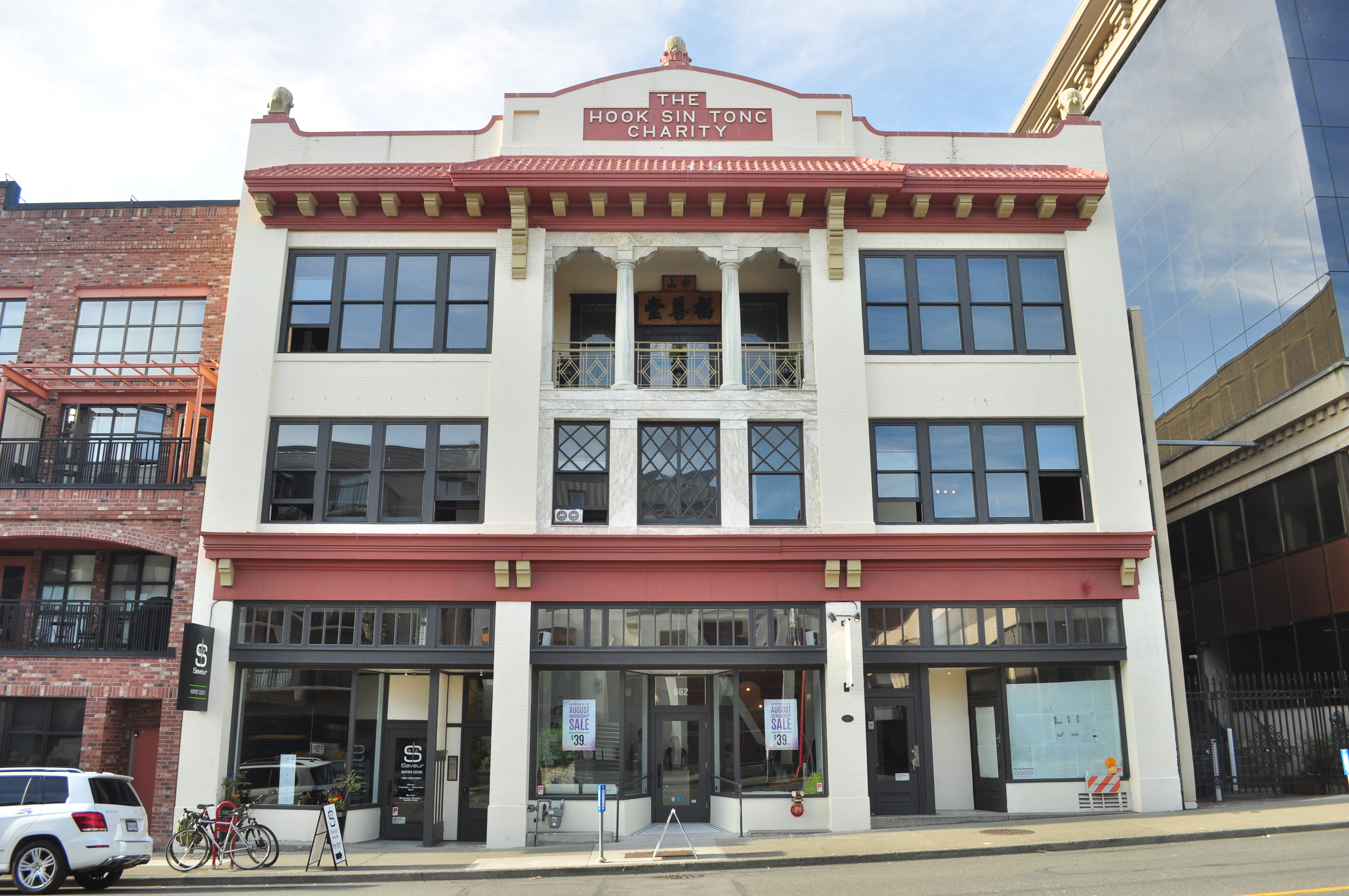
- The building's exterior in 2015
- Interactive map of the Hook Sin Tong Charity Building area

General information
- Location: 658 Herald St., Victoria, British Columbia, Canada
- Coordinates: 48°25′49.696″N 123°21′55.134″W

Technical details
- Floor count: 3

The Hook Sin Tong Charity Building is an historic building in Victoria, British Columbia, Canada.

== See also ==
- List of historic places in Victoria, British Columbia
