= List of historic places in Victoria, British Columbia =

This is a list of historic places in the City of Victoria, British Columbia entered on the Canadian Register of Historic Places, whether they are designated federally, provincially or municipally. For a list of historic places in the remainder of the Capital Regional District refer to the List of historic places in Capital Regional District.

Name	Address	Coordinates	Government recognition (CRHP №)	Wikidata ID	Image
10-14 Fan Tan Alley	10-14 Fan Tan Alley; Victoria BC	48°25′44″N 123°22′05″W	Victoria municipality (14929)		More images
Charles Hayward House	1003 Vancouver Street; Victoria BC	48°25′21″N 123°21′25″W	Victoria municipality (9072)		More images
Heritage House	1004 Fairfield Road; Victoria BC	48°25′07″N 123°21′29″W	Victoria municipality (9073)		
Edmund Johnson House	1011 Burdett Avenue; Victoria BC	48°25′17″N 123°21′25″W	Victoria municipality (9070)		Upload Photo
William Hampson House	1012 Richardson Street; Victoria BC	48°25′12″N 123°21′25″W	Victoria municipality (9071)		
Richard Hamilton House	1017 Catherine Street; Victoria BC	48°26′10″N 123°23′02″W	Victoria municipality (3864)		Upload Photo
1023 Oliphant Avenue	1023 Oliphant Avenue; Victoria BC	48°24′49″N 123°21′29″W	Victoria municipality (9074)		
1029 Pakington Street	1029 Pakington Street; Victoria BC	48°25′02″N 123°21′25″W	Victoria municipality (9104)		
1060 Burdett Avenue	1060 Burdett Avenue; Victoria BC	48°25′18″N 123°21′18″W	Victoria municipality (9105)		More images
1114 Arthur Currie Lane	1114 Arthur Currie Lane; Victoria BC	48°26′13″N 123°23′02″W	Victoria municipality (3873)		More images
1120 Faithful Street	1120 Faithful Street; Victoria BC	48°24′38″N 123°21′22″W	Victoria municipality (10271)		
1129 Wharf Street/15 Bastion Square	1129 Wharf Street; Victoria BC	48°25′33″N 123°22′12″W	Victoria municipality (6086)		More images
1134 Dallas Road	1134 Dallas Road; Victoria BC	48°24′29″N 123°21′22″W	Victoria municipality (9106)		
1215-1221 Wharf Street	1215-1221 Wharf Street; Victoria BC	48°25′35″N 123°22′12″W	Victoria municipality (6089)		More images
1218 Wharf Street	1218 Wharf Street; Victoria BC	48°25′35″N 123°22′12″W	Victoria municipality (6090)		More images
123 Cambridge Street	123 Cambridge Street; Victoria BC	48°24′39″N 123°21′14″W	Victoria municipality (9107)		
1239-1241 Government Street	1241 Government Street; Victoria BC	48°25′35″N 123°22′01″W	Victoria municipality (3959)		More images
1261 Richardson Street	1261 Richardson Street; Victoria BC	48°25′07″N 123°20′56″W	Victoria municipality (9108)		
1314 Wharf Street	1314 Wharf Street; Victoria BC	48°25′39″N 123°22′16″W	Victoria municipality (2002)		More images
1316-1328 Government Street/589 Johnson Street	1320 Government Street; Victoria BC	48°25′38″N 123°22′05″W	Victoria municipality (3960)		More images
1316-18 Wharf Street	1316-18 Wharf Street; Victoria BC	48°25′39″N 123°22′16″W	Victoria municipality (2003)		More images
132 South Turner Street	132 South Turner Street; Victoria BC	48°24′48″N 123°22′19″W	Victoria municipality (3871)		
138 Dallas Road	138 Dallas Road; Victoria BC	48°25′00″N 123°23′06″W	Victoria municipality (3866)		
139 Cook Street	139 Cook Street; Victoria BC	48°24′40″N 123°21′25″W	Victoria municipality (9127)		
1408-1410 Broad Street	1410 Broad Street; Victoria BC	48°25′40″N 123°21′58″W	Victoria municipality (3934)		
141 Eberts Street	141 Eberts Street; Victoria BC	48°24′39″N 123°20′46″W	Victoria municipality (10269)		Upload Photo
1458 Begbie Street	1458 Begbie Street; Victoria BC	48°25′41″N 123°20′24″W	Victoria municipality (3875)		More images
1459 Vining Street	1459 Vining Street; Victoria BC	48°25′45″N 123°20′24″W	Victoria municipality (3876)		Upload Photo
15 Cook Street	15 Cook Street; Victoria BC	48°24′31″N 123°21′25″W	Victoria municipality (9128)		
1702 Fernwood Road	1702 Fernwood Road; Victoria BC	48°25′40″N 123°20′46″W	Victoria municipality (3867)		More images
19 Bastion Square	19 Bastion Square; Victoria BC	48°25′33″N 123°22′08″W	Victoria municipality (14791)		
2008 Chambers Street	2008 Chambers Street; Victoria BC	48°25′52″N 123°21′00″W	Victoria municipality (18407)		
223 Robert Street	223 Robert Street; Victoria BC	48°25′44″N 123°23′17″W	Federal (4113), Victoria municipality (3870)		More images
25 Cook Street	25 Cook Street; Victoria BC	48°24′32″N 123°21′25″W	Victoria municipality (9130)		
27 Olympia Avenue	27 Olympia Avenue; Victoria BC	48°24′35″N 123°22′12″W	Victoria municipality (3878)		
3040 Carroll Street	3040 Carroll Street; Victoria BC	48°26′42″N 123°22′59″W	Victoria municipality (18472)		Upload Photo
505-511 Pandora Avenue	505-511 Pandora Avenue; Victoria BC	48°25′42″N 123°22′08″W	Victoria municipality (6055)		More images
510-512 Yates Street	510-512 Yates Street; Victoria BC	48°25′38″N 123°22′12″W	Victoria municipality (6091)		More images
515-527 1/2 Pandora Avenue	515-527 1/2 Pandora Avenue; Victoria BC	48°25′42″N 123°22′08″W	Victoria municipality (6058)		More images
533 Yates Street	533 Yates Street; Victoria BC	48°25′36″N 123°22′08″W	Victoria municipality (6092)		More images
535 Yates Street	535 Yates Street; Victoria BC	48°25′35″N 123°22′08″W	Victoria municipality (6093)		More images
536 Yates Street	536 Yates Street; Victoria BC	48°25′38″N 123°22′08″W	Victoria municipality (6338)		More images
536-544 Pandora Avenue	538 Pandora Avenue; Victoria BC	48°25′44″N 123°22′05″W	Victoria municipality (3930)		More images
538 Yates Street	538 Yates Street; Victoria BC	48°25′38″N 123°22′08″W	Victoria municipality (3936)		More images
55 Oswego Street	55 Oswego Street; Victoria BC	48°24′56″N 123°22′48″W	Victoria municipality (3869)		
557-559 Johnson Street	557-559 Johnson Street; Victoria BC	48°25′39″N 123°22′08″W	Victoria municipality (6069)		More images
560 Yates Street	560 Yates Street; Victoria BC	48°25′37″N 123°22′05″W	Victoria municipality (2045)		More images
565 Johnson Street	565 Johnson Street; Victoria BC	48°25′39″N 123°22′05″W	Victoria municipality (6071)		More images
567-569 Johnson Street	567-569 Johnson Street; Victoria BC	48°25′39″N 123°22′05″W	Victoria municipality (6072)		More images
571-577 Johnson Street	571-577 Johnson Street; Victoria BC	48°25′38″N 123°22′05″W	Victoria municipality (6084)		More images
613 Avalon Road	613 Avalon Road; Victoria BC	48°24′54″N 123°22′08″W	Victoria municipality (3861)		
619 Avalon Road	619 Avalon Road; Victoria BC	48°24′54″N 123°22′08″W	Victoria municipality (3862)		
725 Vancouver Street	725 Vancouver Street; Victoria BC	48°25′12″N 123°21′25″W	Victoria municipality (9150)		More images
727-729 Yates Street	727 Yates Street; Victoria BC	48°25′33″N 123°21′50″W	Victoria municipality (3938)		More images
731 Vancouver Street	731 Vancouver Street; Victoria BC	48°25′13″N 123°21′25″W	Victoria municipality (9153)		More images
737 Vancouver Street	737 Vancouver Street; Victoria BC	48°25′13″N 123°21′25″W	Victoria municipality (9154)		More images
743 Vancouver Street	743 Vancouver Street; Victoria BC	48°25′14″N 123°21′25″W	Victoria municipality (9155)		
791 Pandora Avenue	791 Pandora Avenue; Victoria BC	48°25′39″N 123°21′43″W	Victoria municipality (6056)		More images
907 Collinson Street	907 Collinson Street; Victoria BC	48°25′11″N 123°21′36″W	Victoria municipality (10267)		
911 Collinson Street	911 Collinson Street; Victoria BC	48°25′11″N 123°21′36″W	Victoria municipality (10016)		
938 Collinson Street	938 Collinson Street; Victoria BC	48°25′11″N 123°21′32″W	Victoria municipality (10268)		
940 Heywood Avenue	940 Heywood Avenue; Victoria BC	48°24′58″N 123°21′36″W	Victoria municipality (10275)		
941 Meares Street	941 Meares Street; Victoria BC	48°25′23″N 123°21′29″W	Victoria municipality (10266)		More images
949 Meares Street	949 Meares Street; Victoria BC	48°25′23″N 123°21′29″W	Victoria municipality (10273)		
962 Fairfield Road	962 Fairfield Road; Victoria BC	48°25′07″N 123°21′32″W	Victoria municipality (10283)		
97 Cook Street	97 Cook Street; Victoria BC	48°24′36″N 123°21′25″W	Victoria municipality (10018)		
Abigail's Hotel	906 McClure Street; Victoria BC	48°25′16″N 123°21′36″W	Victoria municipality (10270)		More images
Adelphi Building	1300-1304 Government Street; Victoria BC	48°25′36″N 123°22′05″W	Victoria municipality (3926)		More images
Alexandra Ladies' Club	716 Courtney Street; Victoria BC	48°25′23″N 123°21′54″W	Victoria municipality (15586)		More images
Ambrosia Bed and Breakfast	522 Quadra Street; Victoria BC	48°25′07″N 123°21′43″W	Victoria municipality (9131)		
B.C. Legislature	501 Belleville Street; Victoria BC	48°25′08″N 123°22′12″W	Victoria municipality (1634)		More images
Ballantyne's Florists	912 Douglas Street; Victoria BC	48°25′25″N 123°21′58″W	Victoria municipality (10289)		More images
Bank of British Columbia	1020-1022 Government Street; Victoria BC	48°25′30″N 123°22′05″W	Victoria municipality (1466)		More images
Bank of Montreal, Government Street Branch	1200 Government Street; Victoria BC	48°25′34″N 123°22′05″W	Victoria municipality (1468)		More images
Bank of Toronto	630 Yates Street; Victoria BC	48°25′35″N 123°21′59″W	Victoria municipality (10284)		More images
Bay Street Armoury	713 Bay Street; Victoria BC	48°26′08″N 123°21′50″W	Federal (14601, (9694)		More images
Bay Street Substation	637 Bay Street; Victoria BC	48°26′08″N 123°22′01″W	Victoria municipality (10291)		More images
BC Electric Company Building	1515 Blanshard Street; Victoria BC	48°25′42″N 123°21′40″W	Victoria municipality (10287)		More images
BC Electric Railway Company Depot	502-508 Discovery Street; Victoria BC	48°25′56″N 123°22′08″W	Victoria municipality (3941)		More images
BC Power Commission	780 Blanshard Street; Victoria BC	48°25′18″N 123°21′47″W	Victoria municipality (3932)		More images
Beaconsfield Inn	998 Humboldt Street; Victoria BC	48°25′04″N 123°21′32″W	Victoria municipality (9015)		
Begbie Hall National Historic Site of Canada	1900 Fort Street; Victoria BC	48°25′57″N 123°19′37″W	Federal (1163)		
Belmont Building	801-807 Government Street; Victoria BC	48°25′23″N 123°22′05″W	Victoria municipality (1470)		More images
Bentall Building	1060 Douglas Street; Victoria BC	48°25′28″N 123°21′58″W	Victoria municipality (10290)		More images
Board of Trade Building	31 Bastion Square; Victoria BC	48°25′34″N 123°22′08″W	Victoria municipality (1479)		More images
Bridgman Building, Broughton Street	604 Broughton Street; Victoria BC	48°25′28″N 123°22′05″W	Victoria municipality (3935)		
Bridgman Building, Government Street	1007 Government Street; Victoria BC	48°25′28″N 123°22′05″W	Victoria municipality (3923)		More images
British American Trust Company Building	737 Fort Street; Victoria BC	48°25′27″N 123°21′50″W	Victoria municipality (15598)		More images
Brown & Cooper / F. Moore Buildings	909-911 Government Street; Victoria BC	48°25′26″N 123°22′05″W	Victoria municipality (15665)		More images
Brown & Cooper Building	910 Gordon Street; Victoria BC	48°25′26″N 123°22′05″W	Victoria municipality (15666)		
Burnes House	18-26 Bastion Square; Victoria BC	48°25′34″N 123°22′08″W	Victoria municipality (14972)		More images
Canada Hotel	1330 Broad Street; Victoria BC	48°25′38″N 123°21′58″W	Victoria municipality (3963)		More images
Canadian National Institute for the Blind Building	1609 Blanshard Street; Victoria BC	48°25′44″N 123°21′40″W	Victoria municipality (10286)		Upload Photo
Carnegie Library	794 Yates Street; Victoria BC	48°25′34″N 123°21′43″W	Victoria municipality (1474)		More images
Causeway Tower and Garage	812 Wharf Street; Victoria BC	48°25′22″N 123°22′08″W	Victoria municipality (14868)		More images
Cecil Roberts House	913 Burdett Avenue; Victoria BC	48°25′17″N 123°21′32″W	Victoria municipality (10017)		
Central Building	620 View Street; Victoria BC	48°25′32″N 123°22′00″W	Victoria municipality (14833)		More images
Chinese Consolidated Benevolent Association and Chinese Public School	636 Fisgard Street; Victoria BC	48°25′47″N 123°21′58″W	Victoria municipality (3929)		More images
Chinese Consolidated Benevolent Association Building	554-62 Fisgard Street; Victoria BC	48°25′47″N 123°22′05″W	Victoria municipality (14891)		More images
Christ Church Cathedral Memorial Hall	911 Quadra Street; Victoria BC	48°25′20″N 123°21′29″W	British Columbia (15487), Victoria municipality (15490)		More images
Church of Our Lord National Historic Site of Canada	626 Blanshard Street; Victoria BC	48°25′14″N 123°21′50″W	Federal (12642), Victoria municipality (1459)		More images
City Brokerage Building	1018 Blanshard Street; Victoria BC	48°25′26″N 123°21′47″W	Victoria municipality (10288)		Upload Photo
City Hall Annex	1 Centennial Square; Victoria BC	48°25′42″N 123°21′58″W	Victoria municipality (10282)		More images
City of Victoria Police Station	625 Fisgard Street; Victoria BC	48°25′45″N 123°21′58″W	Victoria municipality (15591)		More images
Colonial Hotel	547-555 Johnson Street; Victoria BC	48°25′39″N 123°22′08″W	Victoria municipality (6063)		More images
Colonial Metropole Hotel	541-545 Johnson Street; Victoria BC	48°25′39″N 123°22′08″W	Victoria municipality (6068)		More images
Congregation Emanu-El National Historic Site of Canada	1421 Blanshard Street; Victoria BC	48°25′37″N 123°21′40″W	Federal (11944), Victoria municipality (1460)		More images
CPR Steamship Terminal	396 Belleville Street; Victoria BC	48°25′16″N 123°22′16″W	Victoria municipality (3928)		More images
Craigdarroch Castle	1050 Joan Crescent; Victoria BC	48°25′19″N 123°20′38″W	Federal (11955), Victoria municipality (1478)		More images
Craigflower Manor House National Historic Site of Canada	110 Island Highway; Victoria BC	48°27′10″N 123°25′26″W	Federal (7600)		More images
Craigflower Schoolhouse National Historic Site of Canada	2755 Admirals Road; Victoria BC	48°27′10″N 123°25′19″W	Federal (12918)		More images
Crystal Garden	701-11 Douglas Street; Victoria BC	48°25′15″N 123°21′58″W	Victoria municipality (1491)		More images
Cusack Printing Office	625 Courtney Street; Victoria BC	48°25′24″N 123°22′01″W	Victoria municipality (15585)		More images
Dashwood Manor	1 Cook Street; Victoria BC	48°24′30″N 123°21′25″W	Victoria municipality (9048)		
Deanery	911 Quadra Street; Victoria BC	48°25′19″N 123°21′32″W	Victoria municipality (15489)		More images
Doane Block	1314-1324 Douglas Street; Victoria BC	48°25′37″N 123°21′54″W	Victoria municipality (3955)		More images
Dominion Hotel	759 Yates Street; Victoria BC	48°25′34″N 123°21′45″W	Victoria municipality (10820)		More images
Duck's Block	1316 BROAD ST; Victoria BC	48°25′38″N 123°21′58″W	Victoria municipality (1489)		More images
Emily Carr House	207 Government Street; Victoria BC	48°24′50″N 123°22′12″W	Federal (10705), British Columbia (1447)		More images
Empress Hotel National Historic Site of Canada	721 Government Street; Victoria BC	48°25′18″N 123°22′05″W	Federal (7414), Victoria municipality (2349)		More images
Esquimalt and Nanaimo Railway Roundhouse National Historic Site of Canada	Esquimalt Road; Victoria BC	48°25′47″N 123°22′52″W	Federal (7416), Victoria municipality (1621)		More images
Estate of the Lieutenant Governor of British Columbia National Historic Site of Canada	1401 Rockland Avenue; Victoria BC	48°25′06″N 123°20′31″W	Federal (7807)		More images
Fairfield Block	1601 Douglas Street; Victoria BC	48°25′44″N 123°21′50″W	Victoria municipality (3957)		More images
Finch Building	719 Yates Street; Victoria BC	48°25′33″N 123°21′50″W	Victoria municipality (15620)		More images
Finlayson Building	1202-1214 Wharf Street; Victoria BC	48°25′34″N 123°22′12″W	Victoria municipality (6087)		More images
Finlayson Building	528 Pandora Avenue; Victoria BC	48°25′43″N 123°22′07″W	Victoria municipality (14794)		More images
First Baptist Church	1600 Quadra Street; Victoria BC	48°25′42″N 123°21′32″W	Victoria municipality (3931)		More images
Former Victoria Law Courts National Historic Site of Canada	28 Bastion Square; Victoria BC	48°25′33″N 123°22′08″W	Federal (14664), Victoria municipality (1475)		More images
Fort Victoria National Historic Site of Canada	Wharf Street at Broughton; Victoria BC	48°25′30″N 123°22′12″W	Federal (16681)		More images
Gee Tuck Tong Benevolent Association Building	622-626 Fisgard Street; Victoria BC	48°25′47″N 123°21′58″W	Victoria municipality (14924)		More images
George Joe Building	564-72 Fisgard Street; Victoria BC	48°25′47″N 123°22′01″W	Victoria municipality (14892)		More images
Grand Pacific Hotel	530-540 Johnson Street; Victoria BC	48°25′40″N 123°22′08″W	Victoria municipality (6059)		More images
Green Block	1210-1216 Broad Street; Victoria BC	48°25′33″N 123°22′01″W	Victoria municipality (15562)		More images
Greenwood Building	1009 Government Street; Victoria BC	48°25′28″N 123°22′05″W	Victoria municipality (3925)		More images
H. Saunders Grocery and Liquor Store	561-563 Johnson Street; Victoria BC	48°25′38″N 123°22′05″W	Victoria municipality (6070)		More images
Hamley Building	1001 Government Street; Victoria BC	48°25′27″N 123°22′05″W	Victoria municipality (3924)		More images
Hampton Court	159 Cook Street; Victoria BC	48°24′41″N 123°21′25″W	Victoria municipality (9129)		
Hanna's Undertaking Parlour	738 Yates Street; Victoria BC	48°25′35″N 123°21′47″W	Victoria municipality (3939)		More images
Helmcken House	638 Elliot Street; Victoria BC	48°25′11″N 123°22′01″W	British Columbia (1458)		More images
Hook Sin Tong Charity Building	658 Herald Street; Victoria BC	48°25′50″N 123°21′54″W	Victoria municipality (14792)		More images
Hotel Douglas	1450 Douglas Street; Victoria BC	48°25′40″N 123°21′54″W	Victoria municipality (1486)		More images
Hudson's Bay Company Department Store	1701 Douglas Street; Victoria BC	48°25′48″N 123°21′50″W	Victoria municipality (1488)		More images
Inner Harbour Causeway	700 Government Street; Victoria BC	48°25′18″N 123°22′08″W	Victoria municipality (1492)		More images
Janion Hotel	1612 Store Street; Victoria BC	48°25′44″N 123°22′12″W	Victoria municipality (6057)		More images
Kaiserhof Hotel	1322 Blanshard Street; Victoria BC	48°25′36″N 123°21′43″W	Victoria municipality (15534)		
Ker Block	512 Fort Street; Victoria BC	48°25′31″N 123°22′08″W	Victoria municipality (15593)		More images
King Edward Hotel	631-645 Yates Street; Victoria BC	48°25′34″N 123°21′58″W	Victoria municipality (15619)		More images
Kong Sin Wing Rooming House	624 1/2 Fisgard Street; Victoria BC	48°25′47″N 123°21′58″W	Victoria municipality (14968)		Upload Photo
Law Chambers	45 Bastion Square; Victoria BC	48°25′32″N 123°22′08″W	Victoria municipality (14793)		
Lee Block	565 Fisgard Street; Victoria BC	48°25′45″N 123°22′01″W	Victoria municipality (14893)		More images
Lee Cheong Building	533 Fisgard Street; Victoria BC	48°25′45″N 123°22′05″W	Victoria municipality (14887)		
Lee Woy & Company Building	557-561 Fisgard Street; Victoria BC	48°25′45″N 123°22′05″W	Victoria municipality (14926)		More images
Lewis & Humphreys Block	566-570 Yates Street; Victoria BC	48°25′37″N 123°22′05″W	Victoria municipality (14869)		More images
Lim Dat Building	1617-23 Store Street; Victoria BC	48°25′45″N 123°22′08″W	Victoria municipality (14870)		More images
Loo Tai Cho Building	549-555 Fisgard Street; Victoria BC	48°25′45″N 123°22′05″W	Victoria municipality (14925)		More images
Lum Sam & Look Den Building	534 Pandora Avenue; Victoria BC	48°25′44″N 123°22′05″W	Victoria municipality (15618)		
Mable Carriage Works	713 Johnson Street; Victoria BC	48°25′36″N 123°21′50″W	Victoria municipality (3965)		More images
Macdonald Block	12-16 Bastion Square; Victoria BC	48°25′34″N 123°22′10″W	Victoria municipality (14969)		More images
Macdonald Building	546 Pandora Avenue; Victoria BC	48°25′44″N 123°22′05″W	Victoria municipality (14795)		
Malahat Building / Old Victoria Custom House National Historic Site of Canada	1002 Wharf Street; Victoria BC	48°25′27″N 123°22′12″W	Federal (4225), Victoria municipality (1473)		More images
Masonic Temple	646-654 Fisgard Street; Victoria BC	48°25′47″N 123°21′54″W	Victoria municipality (3940)		More images
McBeath House	614 Seaforth Street; Victoria BC	48°25′46″N 123°23′20″W	Victoria municipality (3874)		
McPherson Playhouse	3 Centennial Square; Victoria BC	48°25′44″N 123°21′58″W	Victoria municipality (3922)		More images
Merchant's Bank of Canada	1225 Douglas Street; Victoria BC	48°25′34″N 123°21′54″W	Victoria municipality (1485)		More images
Metropolitan Building	811-817 Government Street; Victoria BC	48°25′24″N 123°22′05″W	Victoria municipality (14790)		More images
Milne Block	546-548 Johnson Street; Victoria BC	48°25′40″N 123°22′08″W	Victoria municipality (6060)		More images
Montrose Apartments	1114 Blanshard Street; Victoria BC	48°25′30″N 123°21′47″W	Victoria municipality (15535)		More images
Morley's Soda Water Factory	1315 Waddington Alley; Victoria BC	48°25′38″N 123°22′08″W	Victoria municipality (3943)		More images
Morris Tobacconists	1116 Government Street; Victoria BC	48°25′30″N 123°22′05″W	Victoria municipality (1467)		More images
National Electric Tramway and Light Company Powerhouse	2110 Store Street; Victoria BC	48°25′59″N 123°22′12″W	Victoria municipality (1494)		More images
New England Hotel	1312-1314 Government Street; Victoria BC	48°25′37″N 123°22′05″W	Victoria municipality (1469)		More images
Ning Young Building	4 Fan Tan Alley; Victoria BC	48°25′44″N 123°22′05″W	Victoria municipality (14928)		More images
Odd Fellows Hall	500 Fort Street; Victoria BC	48°25′30″N 123°22′11″W	Victoria municipality (14789)		More images
Odeon Theatre	780 Yates Street; Victoria BC	48°25′34″N 123°21′45″W	Victoria municipality (10285)		More images
On Hing & Brothers Store	546-52 Fisgard Street; Victoria BC	48°25′47″N 123°22′05″W	Victoria municipality (14890)		More images
On Hing Brothers Building	1710-1714 Government Street; Victoria BC	48°25′47″N 123°22′01″W	Victoria municipality (14894)		
On Hing Building	538-44 Fisgard Street; Victoria BC	48°25′47″N 123°22′05″W	Victoria municipality (14888)		More images
Oriental Hotel	550-552 Yates Street; Victoria BC	48°25′37″N 123°22′05″W	Victoria municipality (1482)		More images
Pacific Transfer Building	506 Fort Street; Victoria BC	48°25′31″N 123°22′08″W	Victoria municipality (15592)		More images
Palace Cigar Store	1306 Government Street; Victoria BC	48°25′37″N 123°22′05″W	Victoria municipality (14970)		More images
Pemberton Memorial Operating Room National Historic Site of Canada	1952 Bay Street; Victoria BC	48°25′58″N 123°19′41″W	Federal (12975)		Upload Photo
Point Ellice House / O'Reilly House National Historic Site of Canada	2616 Pleasant Street; Victoria BC	48°26′10″N 123°22′37″W	Federal (12601), British Columbia (1129)		
Pinehurst	617 Battery Street; Victoria BC	48°24′39″N 123°22′21″W	Victoria municipality (3863)		
Pioneer Square Park	6030 Quadra Street; Victoria BC	48°25′24″N 123°21′33″W	Victoria municipality (19974)		More images
Porter Block	1402-1406 Douglas Street; Victoria BC	48°25′39″N 123°21′54″W	Victoria municipality (3956)		More images
Prior Building	1401 Government Street; Victoria BC	48°25′39″N 123°22′01″W	Victoria municipality (3962)		More images
Portland Hotel	721-25 Yates Street; Victoria BC	48°25′33″N 123°21′49″W	Victoria municipality (15621)		More images
Promise Block	1006 Government Street; Victoria BC	48°25′30″N 123°22′05″W	Victoria municipality (1465)		
R.V. Winch and Company Building	670 Fort Street; Victoria BC	48°25′29″N 123°21′58″W	Victoria municipality (15597)		More images
Reid Block	1205-1213 Wharf Street; Victoria BC	48°25′35″N 123°22′12″W	Victoria municipality (6088)		More images
Reynolds Block	1300 Douglas Street; Victoria BC	48°25′36″N 123°21′54″W	Victoria municipality (1487)		More images
Rhode's Bakery	1427-1437 Store Street; Victoria BC	48°25′42″N 123°22′08″W	Victoria municipality (6066)		More images
Rithet Building	1107-1125 Wharf Street; Victoria BC	48°25′32″N 123°22′12″W	Victoria municipality (6085)		More images
Robinson's Sporting Goods	1307 Broad Street; Victoria BC	48°25′36″N 123°21′58″W	Victoria municipality (3933)		More images
Rogers Building National Historic Site of Canada	913 Government Street; Victoria BC	48°25′26″N 123°22′05″W	Federal (4424), Victoria municipality (1463)		More images
Rose Manor	730 Quadra Street; Victoria BC	48°25′14″N 123°21′40″W	Victoria municipality (9149)		More images
Roslyn	1135 Catherine Street; Victoria BC	48°26′16″N 123°23′06″W	Victoria municipality (3865)		Upload Photo
Ross Bay Cemetery	1495 Fairfield Road; Victoria BC	48°24′40″N 123°20′28″W	Victoria municipality (1480)		More images
Rossland Apartments	1270 Yates Street; Victoria BC	48°25′29″N 123°20′46″W	Victoria municipality (3891)		More images
Royal Bank Building	1108 Government Street; Victoria BC	48°25′31″N 123°22′05″W	Victoria municipality (15615)		More images
Royal Theatre	805 Broughton Street; Victoria BC	48°25′23″N 123°21′43″W	Federal (4422), Victoria municipality (1476)		More images
Sayward Building	1201-1213 Douglas Street; Victoria BC	48°25′33″N 123°21′54″W	Victoria municipality (15589)		More images
Scott and Peden Building	1415-1425 Store Street; Victoria BC	48°25′41″N 123°22′11″W	Victoria municipality (6065)		More images
Scott Building	705 Johnson Street; Victoria BC	48°25′37″N 123°21′50″W	Victoria municipality (3964)		More images
Sheam & Lee Building	539 Fisgard Street; Victoria BC	48°25′45″N 123°22′05″W	Victoria municipality (14889)		More images
Simmons Block	907 Government Street; Victoria BC	48°25′25″N 123°22′05″W	Victoria municipality (15599)		More images
Simon Leiser Building	524 Yates Street; Victoria BC	48°25′38″N 123°22′08″W	Victoria municipality (1483)		More images
South Park School	508 Douglas Street; Victoria BC	48°25′04″N 123°21′58″W	Victoria municipality (1462)		More images
Southgate & Lascelles Building	1102 Government Street; Victoria BC	48°25′30″N 123°22′05″W	Victoria municipality (15614)		More images
St. Andrew's Catholic Cathedral	1202 Blanshard Street; Victoria BC	48°25′30″N 123°21′47″W	Federal (13349), Victoria municipality (1472)		More images
St. Andrew's Presbyterian Church	924 Douglas Street; Victoria BC	48°25′26″N 123°21′58″W	Victoria municipality (14788)		More images
St Ann's Academy National Historic Site of Canada	835 Humboldt Street; Victoria BC	48°25′09″N 123°21′47″W	Federal (9351), British Columbia (1477)		More images
St. Joseph's Apartments (formerly St. Joseph's Hospital, 1876-1980s)	840 Humboldt Street; Victoria BC	48°25′12″N 123°21′43″W	Victoria municipality (10272)		More images
Station Hotel	501 Pandora Avenue; Victoria BC	48°25′42″N 123°22′08″W	Victoria municipality (15616)		More images
Stores Building	254 Belleville Street; Victoria BC	48°25′21″N 123°22′30″W	Victoria municipality (2649)		
Strand Hotel	550-554 Johnson Street; Victoria BC	48°25′40″N 123°22′08″W	Victoria municipality (6064)		More images
Strathcona Hotel	919 Douglas Street; Victoria BC	48°25′24″N 123°21′54″W	Victoria municipality (3942)		More images
Sussex Apartment Hotel	1001-1019 Douglas Street; Victoria BC	48°25′26″N 123°21′54″W	Victoria municipality (15588)		More images
Temple Building	519-525 Fort Street; Victoria BC	48°25′29″N 123°22′08″W	Victoria municipality (15594)		More images
Thomas Earle Warehouse	530-534 Yates Street; Victoria BC	48°25′38″N 123°22′08″W	Victoria municipality (1484)		More images
Thomas Nicholson Grocery	1328 Douglas Street; Victoria BC	48°25′38″N 123°21′54″W	Victoria municipality (15587)		More images
Trebatha	1124 Fort Street; Victoria BC	48°25′25″N 123°21′11″W	Victoria municipality (3877)		More images
Tweedsmuir Mansions	900 Park Boulevard; Victoria BC	48°24′47″N 123°21′36″W	Victoria municipality (10274)		
Tye Chong Building	529 Pandora Avenue; Victoria BC	48°25′42″N 123°22′05″W	Victoria municipality (15617)		More images
Union Bank	1205 Government Street; Victoria BC	48°25′33″N 123°22′01″W	Victoria municipality (3958)		More images
Union Club	805 Gordon Street; Victoria BC	48°25′22″N 123°22′01″W	Victoria municipality (1490)		More images
Vernon Block	1000-1002 Government Street; Victoria BC	48°25′28″N 123°22′05″W	Victoria municipality (15613)		
Victoria City Hall National Historic Site of Canada	1 Centennial Square; Victoria BC	48°25′43″N 123°21′54″W	Federal (7548), Victoria municipality (1461)		More images
Victoria Conservatory of Music	1411 Quadra Street; Victoria BC	48°25′37″N 123°21′29″W	Victoria municipality (1471)		More images
Victoria Gas Company	502 Pembroke Street; Victoria BC	48°25′58″N 123°22′08″W	Victoria municipality (6339)		More images
Victoria Gas Company Works	512 Pembroke Street; Victoria BC	48°25′58″N 123°22′08″W	Victoria municipality (1495)		
Victoria Hotel	1400 Government Street; Victoria BC	48°25′41″N 123°22′01″W	Victoria municipality (1493)		More images
Victoria Hotel	901-905 Government Street; Victoria BC	48°25′25″N 123°22′06″W	Victoria municipality (14832)		More images
Victoria's Chinatown National Historic Site of Canada	Pandora, Fisgard, Government, Herald Streets; Victoria BC	48°25′45″N 123°22′05″W	Federal (7698)		More images
W.G. Cameron Building	581 Johnson Street; Victoria BC	48°25′38″N 123°22′05″W	Victoria municipality (3961)		More images
Weiler Brothers Warerooms	1005 Broad Street; Victoria BC	48°25′27″N 123°21′58″W	Victoria municipality (15561)		More images
Weiler Building	921 Government Street; Victoria BC	48°25′26″N 123°22′05″W	Victoria municipality (1464)		More images
Wentworth Villa	1156 Fort Street; Victoria BC	48°25′24″N 123°21′04″W	Victoria municipality (3868)		Upload Photo
Westholme Hotel	1415 Government Street; Victoria BC	48°25′41″N 123°22′01″W	Victoria municipality (6337)		
Willie's Bakery	537 Johnson Street; Victoria BC	48°25′39″N 123°22′08″W	Victoria municipality (6067)		More images
Yarrow Building	637-649 Fort Street; Victoria BC	48°25′26″N 123°22′01″W	Victoria municipality (1481)		
Yarrow Chapel	911 Quadra Street; Victoria BC	48°25′19″N 123°21′29″W	Victoria municipality (15488)		More images
Yates Block	1244 Wharf Street; Victoria BC	48°25′36″N 123°22′16″W	Victoria municipality (3927)		More images
Yee King Yum Building	17-23 Fan Tan Alley; Victoria BC	48°25′44″N 123°22′05″W	Victoria municipality (14927)		More images
Yen Wo Society Building	1713 Government Street; Victoria BC	48°25′47″N 123°22′01″W	Victoria municipality (14971)		More images
