= Rithet Building =

Building in Victoria, British Columbia, Canada

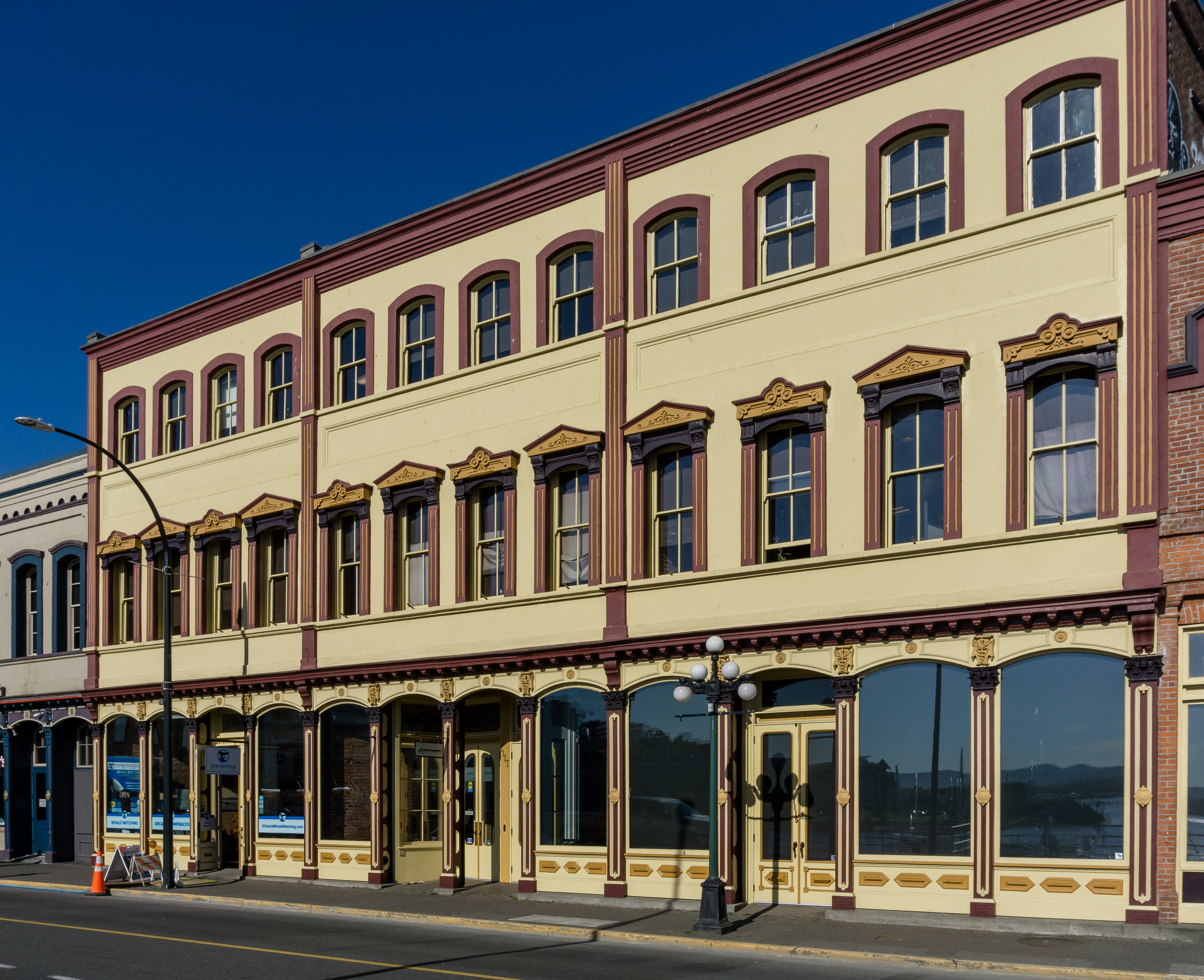
- The building's exterior in 2018
- Interactive map of the Rithet Building area

General information
- Location: 1107-1125 Wharf Street, Victoria, British Columbia, Canada
- Coordinates: 48.4256°N 123.3696°W

The Rithet Building is an historic building in Victoria, British Columbia, Canada. It is a three-storey brick commercial building on the east side of Wharf Street, facing Victoria's Inner Harbour.

== See also ==
- List of historic places in Victoria, British Columbia
