= Point Ellice =

Point Ellice is a geographic place name. Point Ellice may refer to:

- Point Ellice Bridge, Victoria, British Columbia, Canada
- Point Ellice Bridge disaster (1896)
- Point Ellice House, Victoria, British Columbia, Canada
- Point Ellice (Washington)
