= Victoria Harbour (British Columbia) =

Public Port of Victoria
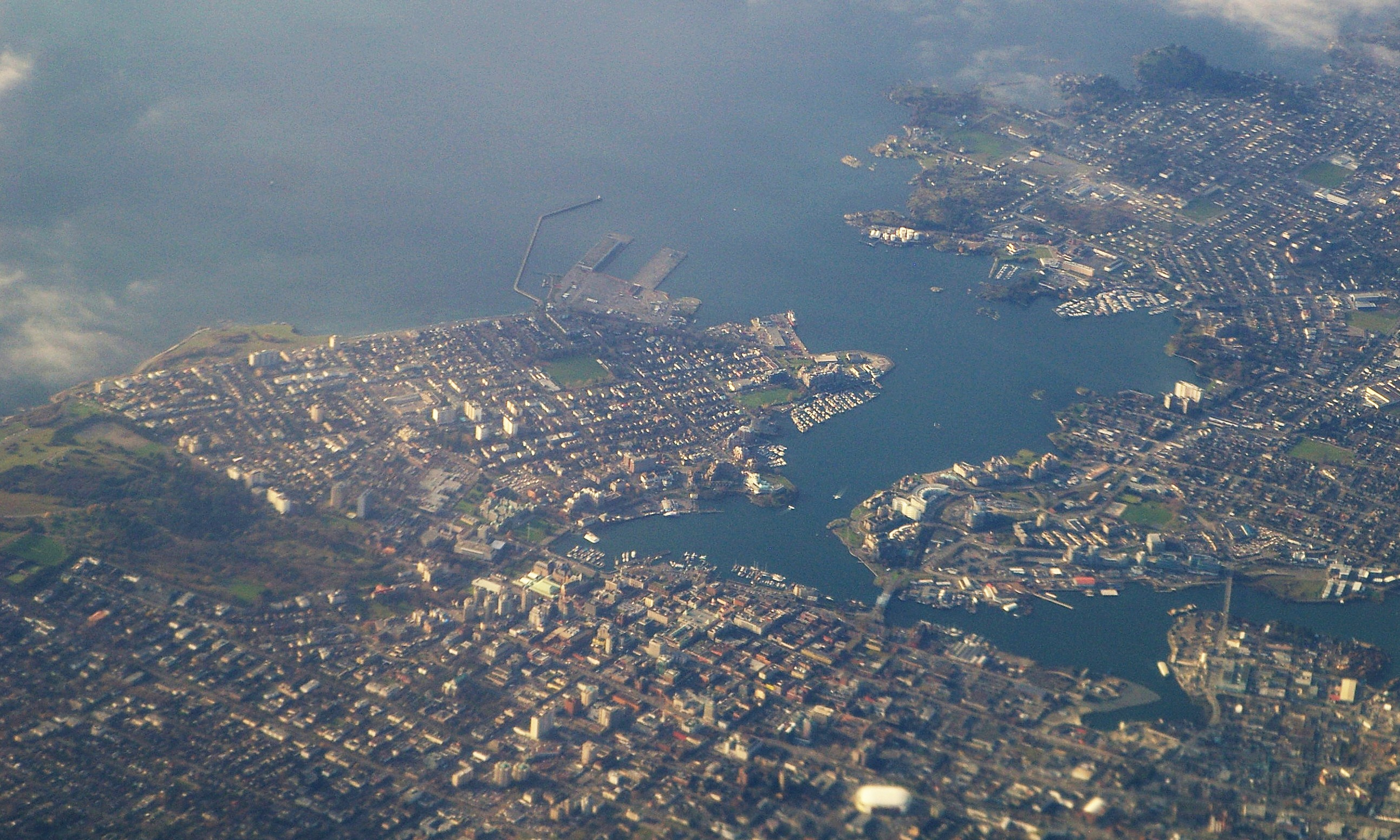
- Aerial view of Victoria Harbour up to Selkirk Water, 11 December 2008
- Interactive map of Public Port of Victoria

Location
- Country: Canada
- Location: Victoria, British Columbia
- Coordinates: 48°25′16″N 123°23′34″W

Details
- Operated by: Transport Canada
- Owned by: Transport Canada
- Type of Harbor: coastal breakwater
- Size of harbour: 250 ha (620 acres)
- Port Manager: Zoe Polden

Statistics
- Vessel arrivals: 202 cruise ships in 2008; 228 cruise ships in 2009 at Ogden Point (excludes ferries)
- Passenger traffic: 380,000 cruise ship passengers in 2008; 400,000 cruise ship passengers in 2009 at Ogden Point (excludes ferry passengers)
- Website https://tc.canada.ca/en/marine-transportation/ports-harbours-anchorages/port-victoria

Victoria Harbour is a harbour, seaport, and seaplane airport in the Canadian city of Victoria, British Columbia. It serves as a cruise ship and ferry destination for tourists and visitors to the city and Vancouver Island. It is both a port of entry and an airport of entry for general aviation. Historically it was a shipbuilding and commercial fishing centre. While the Inner Harbour is fully within the City of Victoria, separating the city's downtown on its east side from the Victoria West neighbourhood, the Upper Harbour serves as the boundary between the City of Victoria and the district municipality of Esquimalt. The inner reaches are also bordered by the district of Saanich and the town of View Royal. Victoria is a federal "public harbour" as defined by Transport Canada. Several port facilities in the harbour are overseen and developed by the Greater Victoria Harbour Authority, however the harbour master's position is with Transport Canada.

== History ==
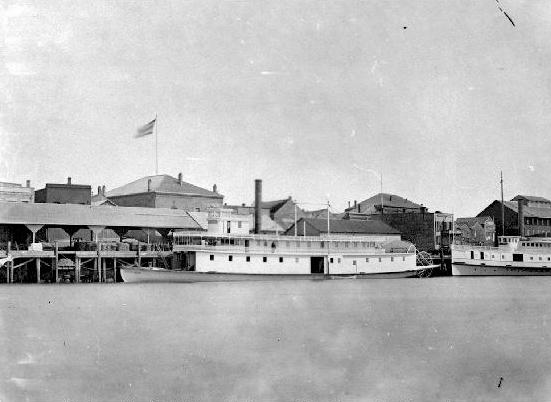
Sternwheeler William Irving on left and sidewheeler George E. Starr on right, in the 1880s

Before European development the Coast Salish Songhees people lived in settlements to the east of the harbour and the Esquimalt people lived to the west of it. They cultivated camas root and other crops in meadows lined with cultivated Garry oak trees along the harbour. Shell middens along the Gorge Waterway are evidence of human habitation dating back 4000 years.

In the summer of 1790 Manuel Quimper, Gonzalo López de Haro, and Juan Carrasco aboard Princesa Real explored the Juan de Fuca Strait where they claimed Esquimalt Harbour for Spain, naming it Puerto de Córdova.

=== 19th century ===
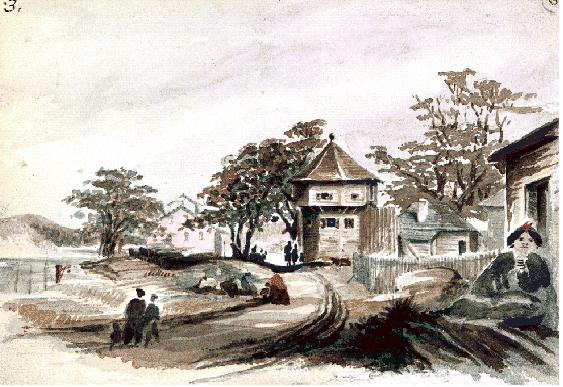
Watercolor painting of the southwest bastion of Fort Victoria with harbour to the left by Sarah Crease (wife of Henry Crease), 8 September 1860

In 1843 James Douglas led the effort to construct an outpost on Vancouver Island for the Hudson's Bay Company. He rejected Esquimalt Harbour due to dense tree growth and chose instead to site Fort Victoria overlooking the Victoria Harbour (at a location that is about 1 block east of today's Wharf Street).

On 11 March 1850 HMS Driver was docked in the harbour to witness Richard Blanshard assume the Governorship of the newly formed Colony of Vancouver Island and issued a seventeen gun salute.

In 1852 sailors from the British naval ship HMS Thetis built a trail through the forest linking the Esquimalt Harbour with Victoria Harbour and Fort Victoria. The trail would eventually be paved and is now known as Old Esquimalt Road (it runs parallel to and just north of Esquimalt Road).

The Fisgard Light and Race Rocks Light were built on islands outside of Esquimalt and Victoria harbours in the years 1859 and 1860. The former light was constructed by Joseph Despard Pemberton as supervising engineer, the latter light was constructed by the crew of HMS Topaze. The two lighthouses were the first built on Canada's west coast and still serve as active aids to navigation.

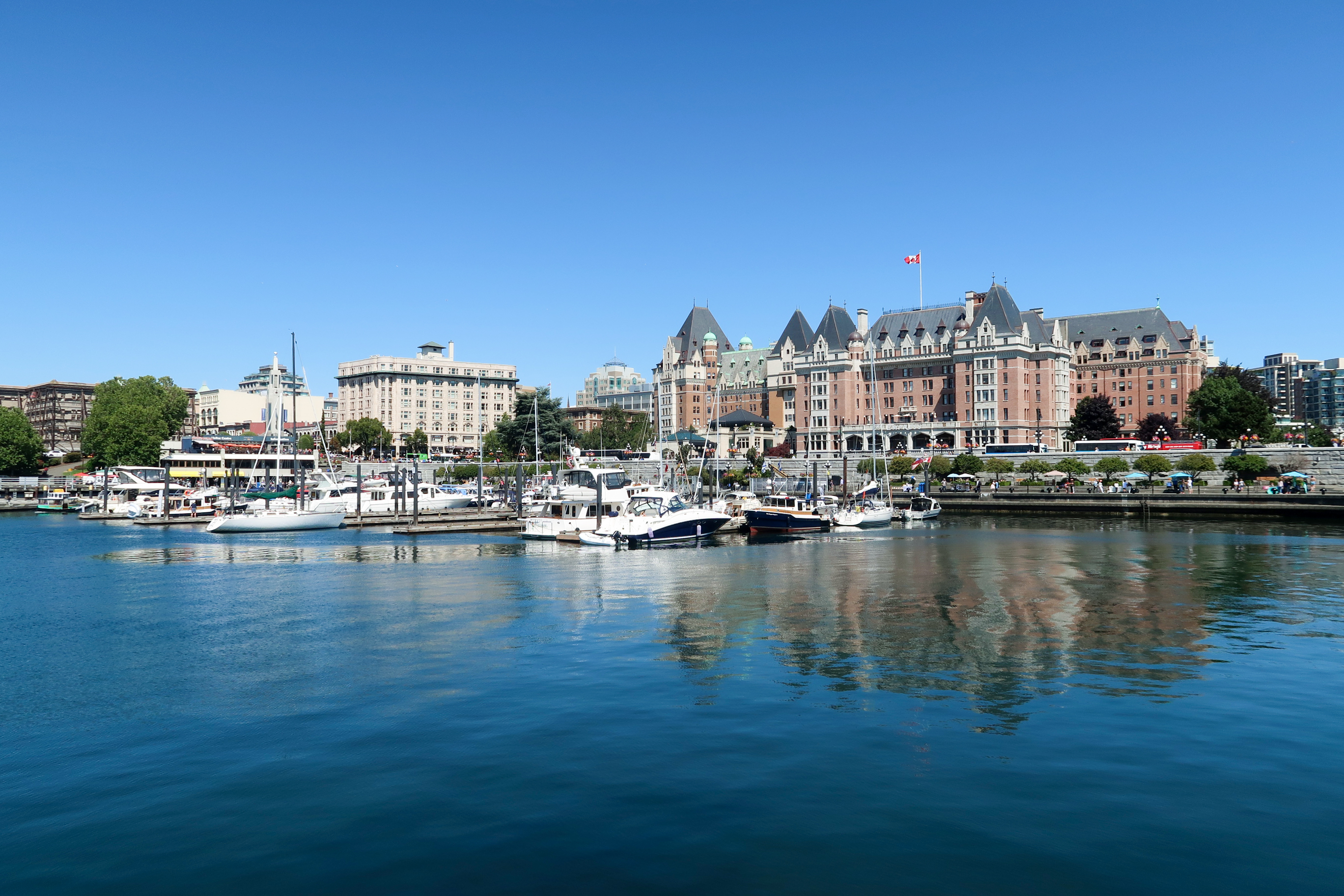
The Empress Hotel overlooks James Bay and the Causeway Floats (2018)

In 1858 the Fraser Canyon Gold Rush took place. In 1861 and 1862 the Cariboo Gold Rush took place. Both of the gold rushes swelled traffic through the harbour as a massive influx of people came to Fort Victoria to buy permits and supplies before setting out for the mainland. Victoria was incorporated as a city on 2 August 1862.

In 1858 Captain William Moore moved from San Francisco Bay to Victoria. He built several barges and steamships in Victoria and participated in trade associated with the gold rushes in British Columbia and eventually the Klondike Gold Rush in the Yukon. Moore died in Victoria 29 March 1909. As a steamship captain Moore was a rival of both William and John Irving.

In 1859 Captain William Irving (1816–1872) became a partner in the Victoria Steam Navigation Company that provided ferry service between New Westminster and Victoria. The Irving family lived for a time in Victoria then in New Westminster. In 1882 William's son Captain John Irving (1854–1936), then 28, ordered the construction of the sternwheeler R.P. Rithet to expand his fleet of the Pioneer Line. R.P. Rithet was constructed by Alexander Watson's shipbuilding company in Victoria. Later in 1882 Irving helped to form the Canadian Pacific Navigation Company (CPNC) and the Pioneer Line ceased to exist. The following year John Irving was made the general manager of the CPNC and he ordered the purchase of Yosemite from California and brought it up to Vancouver to serve as a ferry from Vancouver to Victoria. In that first year of service Yosemite set a speed record of four hours and 20 minutes for the 72-nautical-mile (133 km; 83 mi) run from Vancouver to Victoria. The record stood until 1901 when the ocean liner Moana made the run in four hours and one minute.

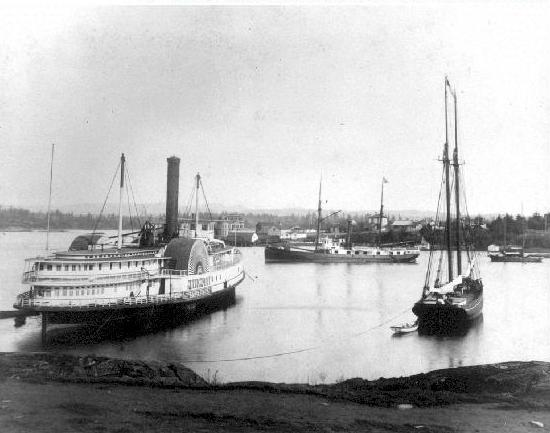
Yosemite and schooner Marguerite anchored in the 1890s

On 24 September 1860 a 14-year-old American named Charles Mitchell hid on board the PS Eliza Anderson – a ferry that was making its way from Olympia, Washington to Victoria – when it was revealed to the crew on board that the young man was a stowaway and may have been a fugitive slave. Upon reaching Victoria Harbour Mitchell was held on board. Soon a group of local Victorians descended to the dock to protest Mitchell's confinement. Legal proceedings ensued and Mitchell was eventually released to become a free Canadian.

In February 1863 carpenters in Victoria established one of British Columbia's first trade unions the Journeymen Shipwrights Association of Victoria & Vancouver Island. On 4 May 1863 Joseph Spratt and Johann Kriemler started the Albion Iron Works that would later become the Victoria Machinery Depot shipbuilding company on property adjacent to the Upper Harbour. In 1888 the company launched their first vessel, Princess, a tugboat built for the Department of Public Works.

In 1865 the British Royal Navy relocated the headquarters of its Pacific fleet from Valparaíso, Chile, to the Esquimalt Royal Navy Dockyard in Esquimalt Harbour. The move meant Esquimalt's harbour took on more of a military character and allowed Victoria's to develop more commercially. Five years after the 1905 departure of the Royal Navy the Pacific base of the new Royal Canadian Navy occupied Esquimalt in 1910 which operates today as CFB Esquimalt.

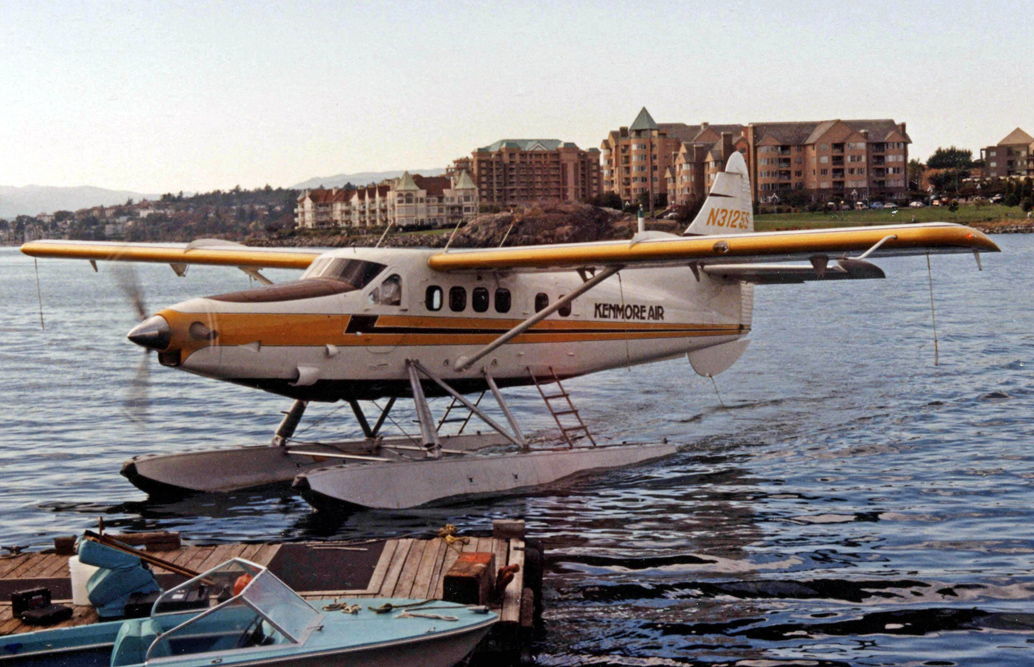
Turbo Otter arriving at Victoria Harbour from Seattle's Lake Union

A shipyard started operating in 1873 at Point Hope on the Upper Harbour. Over the years the shipyard had traded hands several times and by 1938 was known as Point Hope Shipyards Limited. Today the yard continues to operate as Point Hope Maritime.

The prominent building at 1002 Wharf Street was constructed as a customs house overlooking the Inner Harbour in 1876. The building would house the naval training organization HMCS Malahat during a part of the 20th century and become known as the Malahat Building.

On 29 March 1888 the first Esquimalt and Nanaimo Railway service started over the first railway bridge to span the harbour. The successor to that line is the Victoria – Courtenay train operated by Via Rail over the Johnson Street Bridge (which opened in January 1924).

The Victoria Yacht Club was founded on 8 June 1892 by a group of 46 yachtsmen and is the oldest sailing association in Western Canada. In 1911 King George V recognized the club's success and granted permission to add a "Royal" prefix to the club's name thereby allowing for the change to the Royal Victoria Yacht Club. On 13 July 1913 the club completed its move from an older clubhouse that was floating on pontoons in the Inner Harbour to a new clubhouse on the shore of Caboro Bay in the nearby community of Oak Bay. In 1912, William D'Oyly Rochfort designed the Victoria Yacht Club clubhouse on Ripon Road, Cadboro Bay. By moving out of the crowded harbour the club members could enjoy sailing with less concern for traffic.

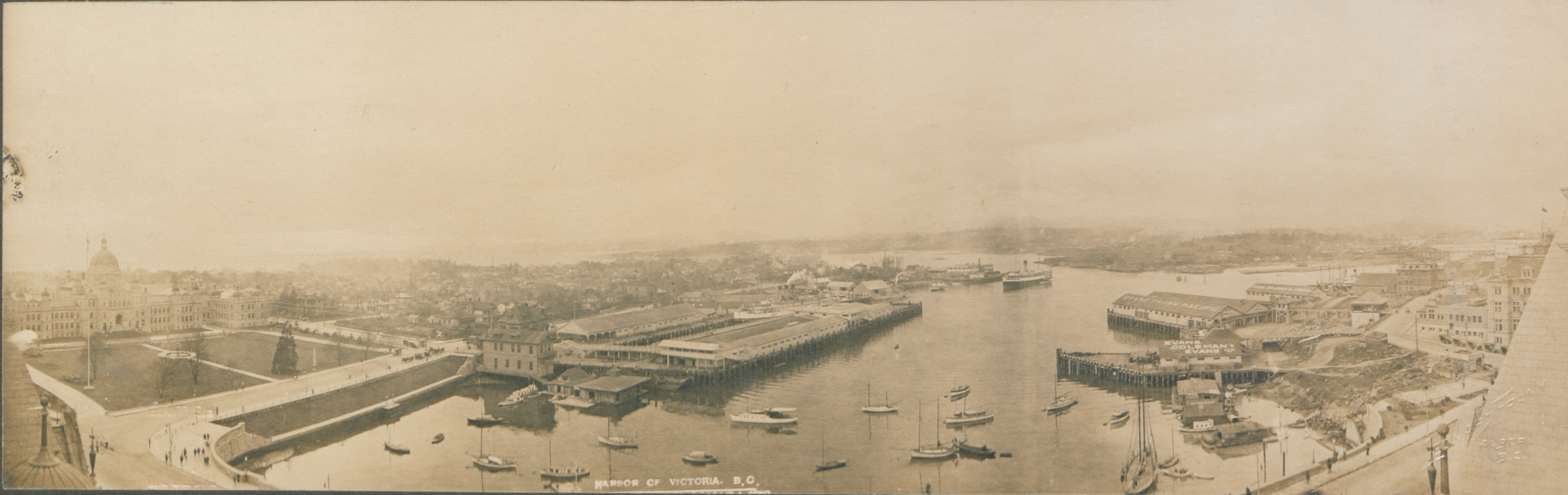
Victoria Harbour from the roof of the Empress Hotel, 1912, Leonard Frank photo

Construction of the provincial Parliament Buildings overlooking the south side of James Bay (Inner Harbour) began in 1893. They opened on 10 February 1898.

=== 20th century ===
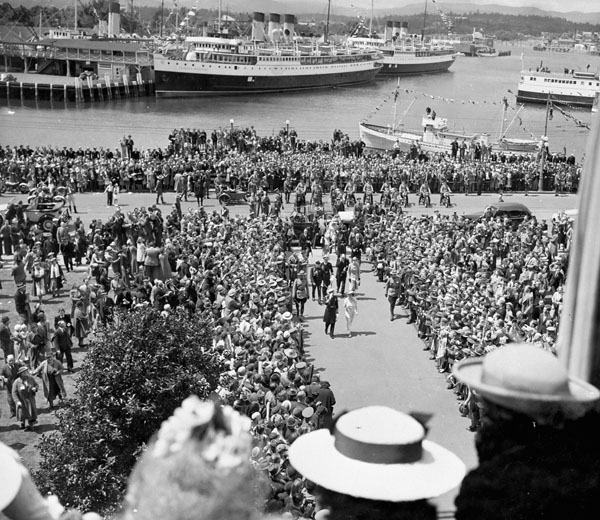
King George VI and Queen Elizabeth visit Victoria from the harbour, 30 May 1939

An 1861 map of Victoria by Joseph Despard Pemberton shows a small wooden piling bridge (built 1859) carrying Government Street over James Bay (named for James Douglas) when it had not yet been filled in. In 1869 a newer more substantial James Bay bridge was opened. The stone James Bay Causeway was constructed starting in 1901, it was finished and appearing in postcards by 1906. The Upper Causeway was built from stone quarried on Nelson Island.

After purchasing the Canadian Pacific Navigation Company in 1901 to form the British Columbia Coast Steamships division, the Canadian Pacific Railway company, through its Canadian Pacific Hotels division, then built the Empress Hotel overlooking James Bay in the Inner Harbour which opened in 1908. The Canadian Pacific Steamship Company operated ships out of Victoria on the so-called triangle route: Victoria, Vancouver, Seattle. From Vancouver passengers could then board an oceangoing Empress liner. The creation of BC Ferries in 1960 put the CP Ships passenger triangle route trade out of business and the ship terminal building was leased to become a wax museum by 1969.

In 1901 Captain John Voss and Norman Luxton set sail from Oak Bay to circumnavigate the world's oceans in the 38-foot (12 m) dugout canoe Tilikum. They stopped in Victoria before setting out across the Pacific Ocean and reached London in 1904. Nowadays Tilikum may be seen on exhibit at the Maritime Museum of British Columbia in Victoria.

In 1905 the British Columbia Electric Railway opened Gorge Park along the Gorge Waterway. The electric streetcar system was abandoned in 1948 and the park was donated to Esquimalt in 1955.

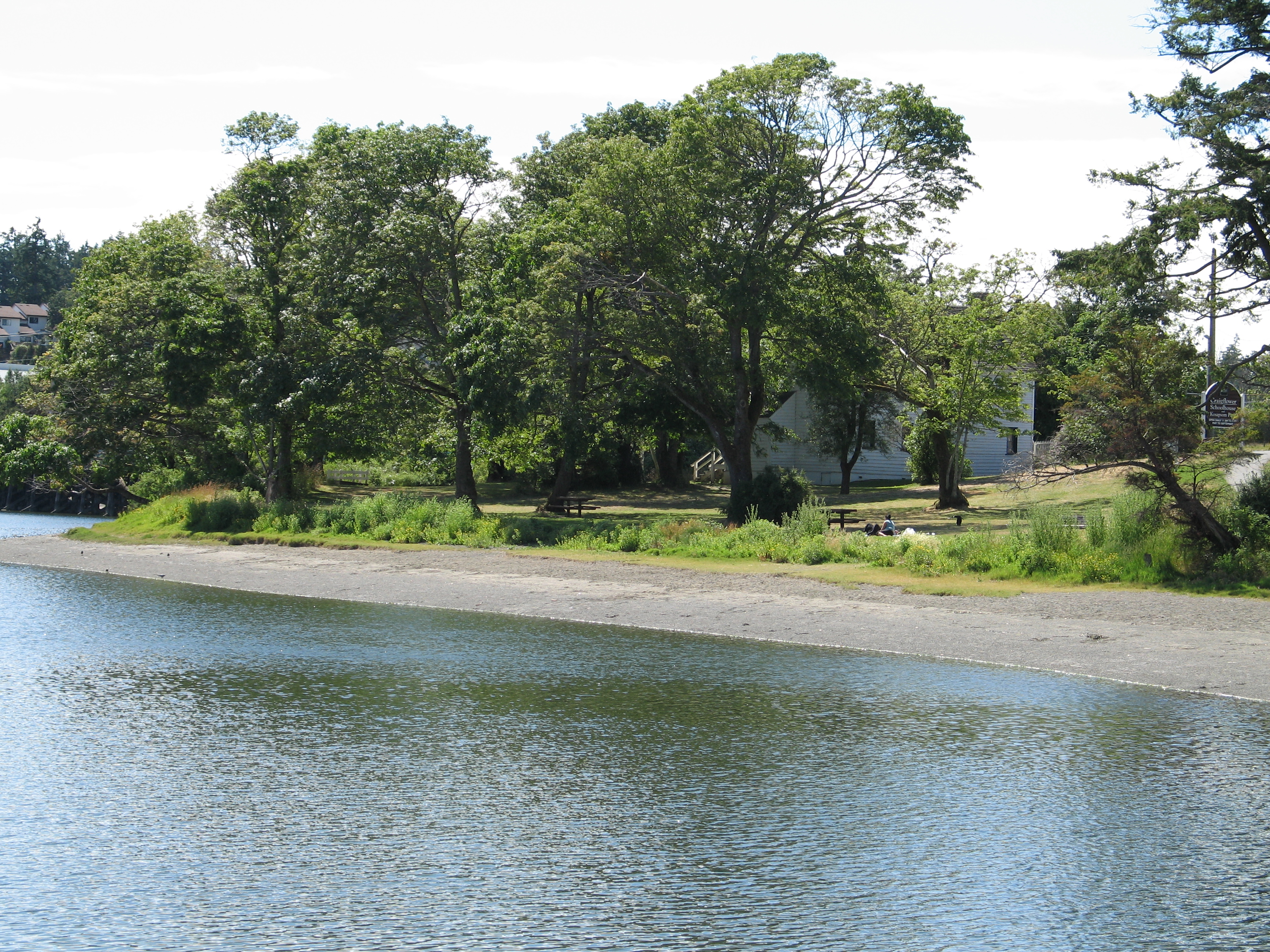
Craigflower Manor seen from the Gorge Waters, 8 July 2007

After the 1914 opening of the Panama Canal the city of Victoria sought to increase ship traffic to the harbour and built the breakwater and Ogden Point piers in 1916 and 1918 respectively for $5 million. In 1925 the city and Panama Pacific Grain Terminal Elevator Co. Ltd. built a 93-foot-high (28 m) grain storage bin to ship Prairie Provinces grain worldwide. In 1928 the federal government granted control over Ogden Point to the Canadian National Railway (CNR). Around 1928 the British Columbia Packers Ltd. (BC Packers) company built a fish processing and cold storage plant at Ogden Point.

After passage of the 1917 Migratory Birds Convention Act 1,700 hectares (4,200 acres) of Victoria Harbour were designated a federal Migratory Bird Sanctuary in 1923.

The first floatplane landed in Victoria in 1919 when William Boeing and Eddie Hubbard beached their plane near Shoal Point as part of a new U.S. International Air Mail service that also stopped at Vancouver and Seattle.

In the spring of 1931 the Imperial Oil Causeway Garage was opened at 812 Wharf Street. The Art Deco building featured a 24.4-metre-high (80 ft) tower that was used as an illuminated aerodrome beacon for aviators to put into Victoria Harbour at night. The light was used until World War II when it was turned off. The garage was used until 1974 then it was acquired by the province in 1975 and lastly by the British Columbia Provincial Capital Commission in 1978. The building serves as a visitor information centre and houses other retail outlets.

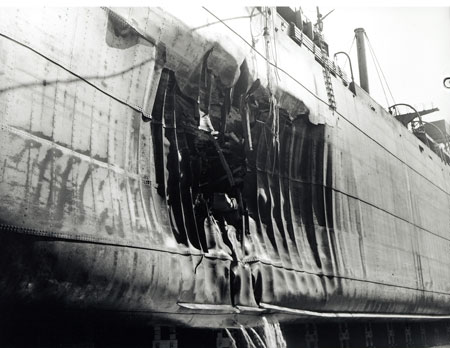
SS Fort Camosun laid up for repairs after torpedo attack

During World War II the Victoria Machinery Depot launched 25 ships, including 5 Flower-class corvette warships for the Royal Canadian Navy, 14 dry cargo ships, 5 tankers, and a stores ship (hull numbers 14 through 39). To carry out the wartime work in 1941 VMD bought the Rithet piers at the Outer Wharf and 11 hectares (27 acres) of surrounding land. On 20 June 1942 the Victoria-built HMCS Quesnel, which was based at Esquimalt, responded to a torpedo attack by the Japanese submarine I-25 upon SS Fort Camosun off of Cape Flattery in Washington, US. The British coal-burning freighter Fort Camosun was on her maiden voyage carrying zinc, lead, and plywood from Victoria to Britain. Quesnel rescued the 31 man crew of Fort Camosun then escorted her as she was towed first to Neah Bay then to Esquimalt Harbour and Victoria Harbour. Fort Camosun was eventually towed to the Port of Seattle for repairs before returning to service.

After the war commercial fishing increased in Victoria. To accommodate the increase a CA$$100,000 Fisherman's Wharf was built near Erie Street, opening 31 March 1948. The 120-metre (390 ft) wharf could moor 60 fish packing ships along six finger float piers.

From February 1954 to February 1964 the Royal Canadian Navy reserve unit HMCS Malahat occupied the old custom house at 1002 Wharf Street. As a result, the building has been nicknamed the Malahat Building and it is the oldest extant federal building in Western Canada. After February 1964 HMCS Malahat occupied building 61 at CFB Esquimalt before moving to the current location at 20 Huron Street overlooking Victoria Harbour on 14 March 1992.

In 1968 Victoria Machinery Depot launched their last vessel MV Doris Yorke which was later named Seaspan Doris, having completed the massive SEDCO 135-F oil platform for Transocean the previous year.

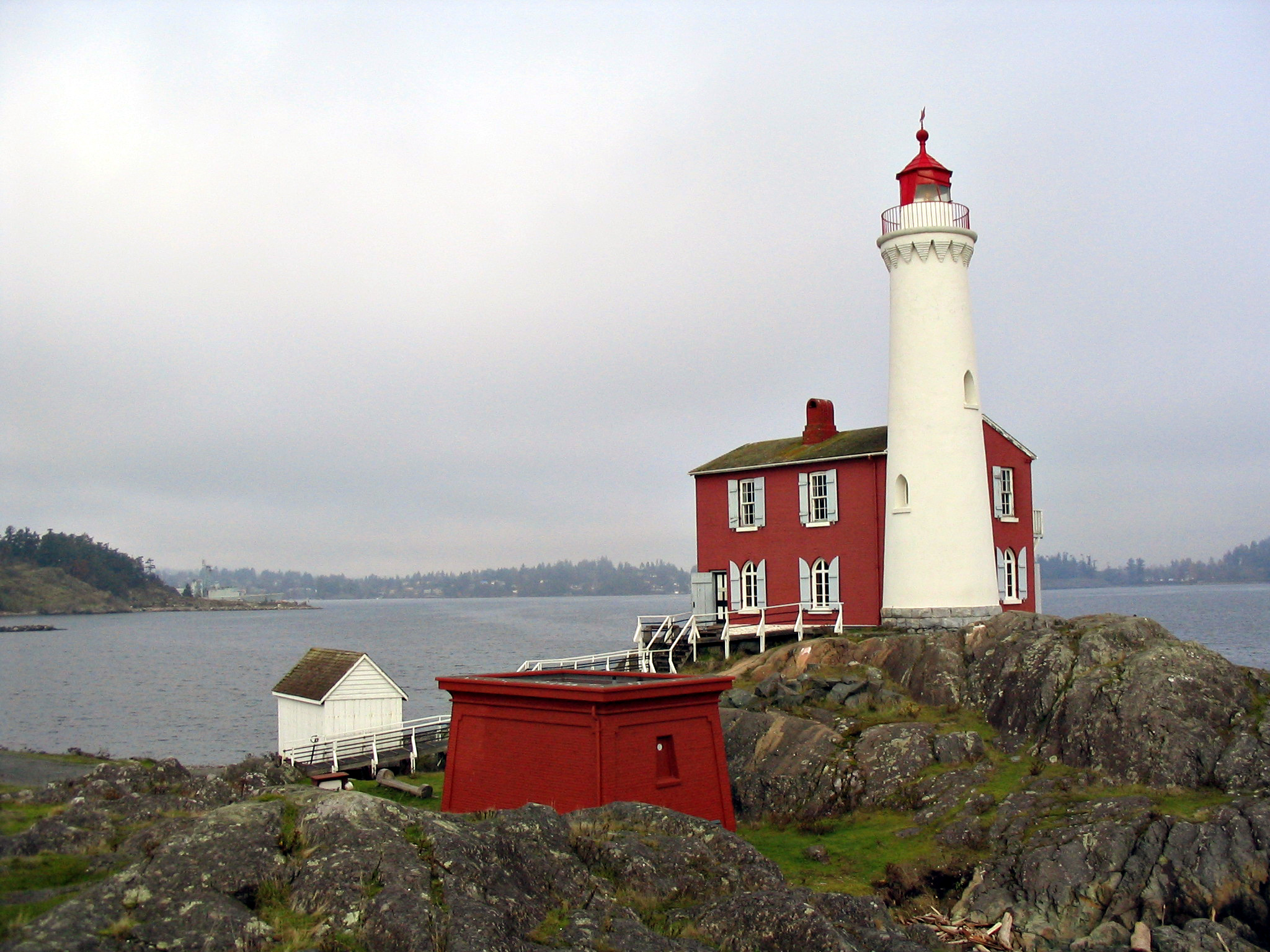
Fisgard Light at the entrance to Esquimalt Harbour with Macaulay Point and Victoria's Outer Harbour in the distance, 20 November 2005

Following a 1969 dredging and expansion by CNR, Ogden Point became a sizable lumber shipping operation. On 8 August 1977 a large fire that was visible from Port Angeles destroyed many of the buildings at Ogden Point. The following year CNR ceded Ogden Point back to the federal government's Transport Canada. However, in 1984 the last of the Victoria Harbour lumber shipping companies, Sooke Forest Products, filed for bankruptcy.

In 1883 Robert P. Rithet (after whom the sternwheeler R.P. Rithet was named) built a large dock facility near Shoal Point, known as the Outer Wharves, which was initially used for sugar warehousing. After the construction of the Empress Hotel in 1908 the Outer Wharves started to land more passenger vessels. In 1975 the Outer Wharves were demolished and construction began on a new Canadian Coast Guard station that opened in 1980.

On 31 March 1990 the BC Packers' cold storage fish factory shut down due to the low catch in Victoria, and in 1993 the five storey plant was torn down.

In 1997 students and faculty from Lester B. Pearson College took over the management of the Race Rocks Lighthouse station.

=== 21st century ===
In 2001 Norwegian Sky arrived from Seattle, becoming the first weekly cruise vessel to call on Ogden Point.

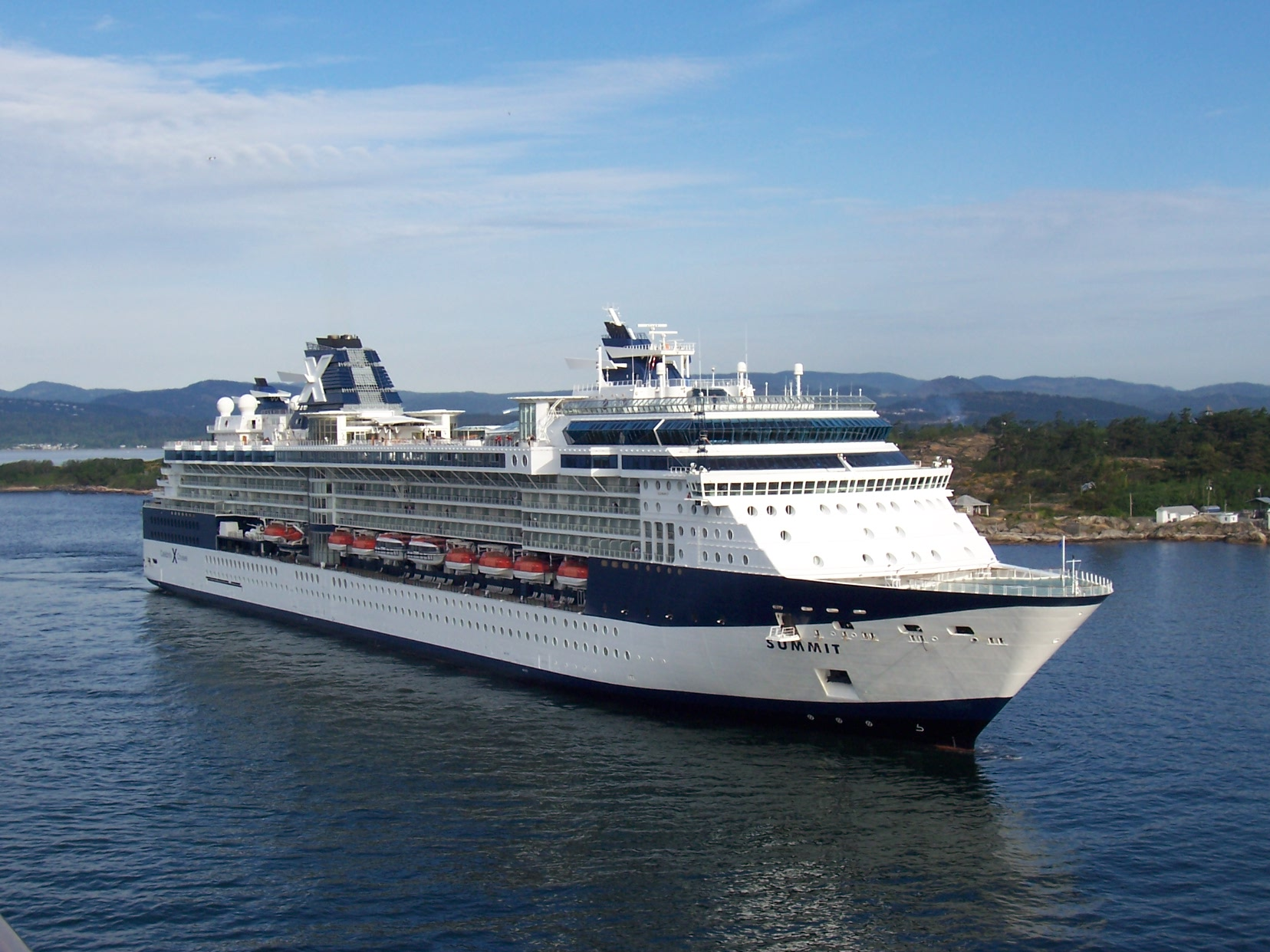
The 294 m (965 ft) Celebrity Summit approaches Ogden Point, 19 May 2006

Victoria sponsored a boat in the 2005–2006 Clipper Round the World Yacht Race and the race boats put into the Causeway Floats facility in the Inner Harbour during one of the stops.

A dock of the Inner Harbour was renamed the Jeanne Socrates Dock in November 2019, in honour of British yachtswoman Jeanne Socrates who in September 2019 had become the oldest person to sail singlehanded and unsupported around the globe in a voyage starting and finishing there.

== Hydrography ==
Victoria Harbour comprises the Outer Harbour, Middle Harbour, Inner Harbour, James Bay, Upper Harbour, Selkirk Water, Gorge Waters, and Portage Inlet. Just to the west of Victoria Harbour is the Esquimalt Harbour.

The active portions of Victoria Harbour that can accommodate large and mid-sized vessels (Outer, Middle, Inner, and Upper) are spread along 4 km (2.5 mi; 2.2 nmi) of estuary. The width of the active harbour goes from 0.74 km (0.46 mi; 0.4 nmi) out at the Ogden Point breakwater entrance down to 137 m (449 ft; 0.074 nmi) along the Middle Harbour then widens out in the Inner and Upper Harbour areas. Harbour depths vary from 6 m (3.3 fathoms; 20 ft) up to 20 m (11 fathoms; 66 ft) in the Inner Harbour.

=== Approach ===
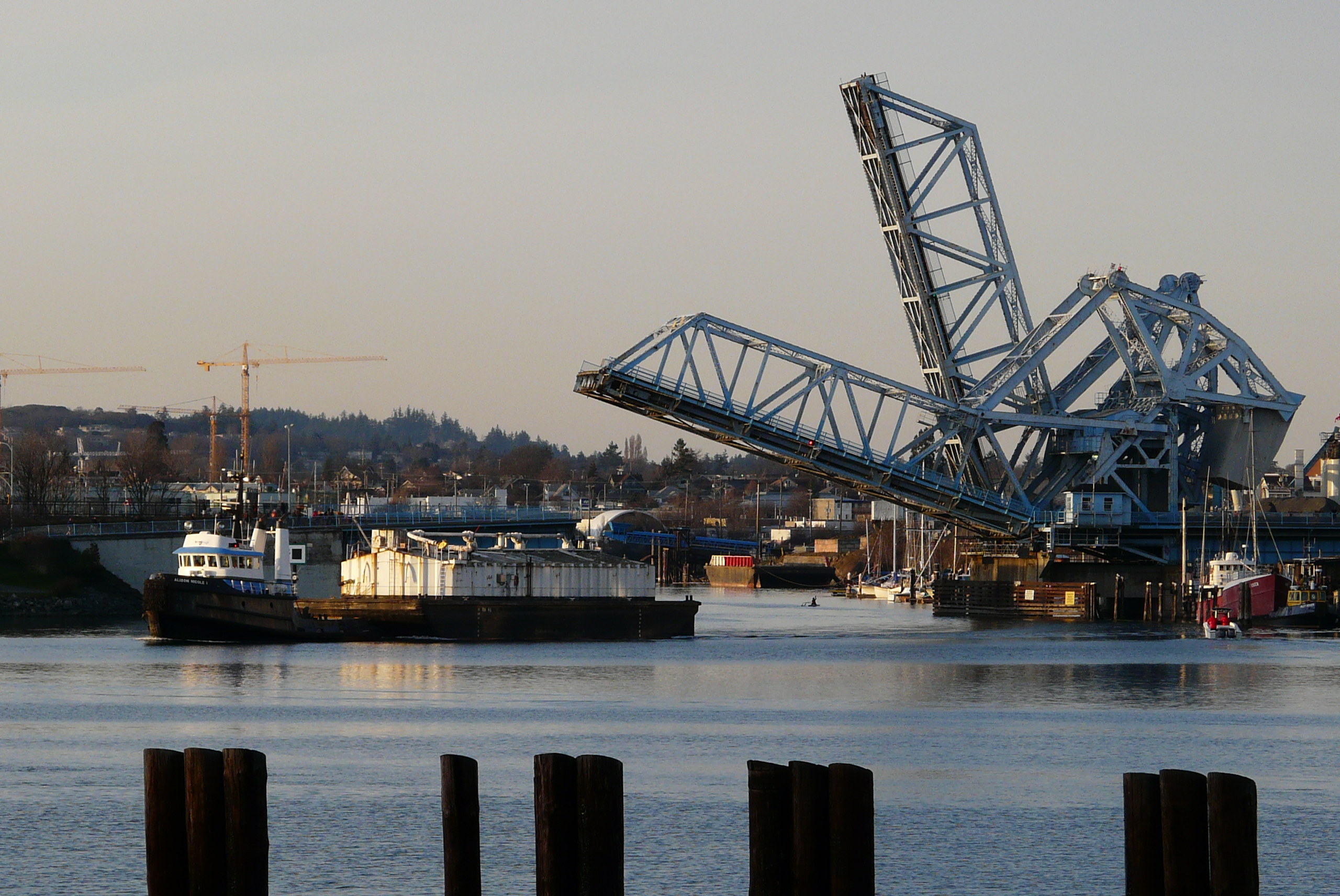
The tug Alison Nicole I tows a covered barge from the Upper Harbour out to the Inner Harbour under the Johnson Street Bridge, 12 March 2009

The approach to the harbour from the Juan de Fuca Strait is through the Royal Roads strait or roadstead. On approach to the Outer Harbour the city of Victoria will lie to starboard and the town of Esquimalt to port.

Large vessel operators should note that traffic on the approach to the Juan de Fuca Strait is handled by MCTS Tofino, within the Juan de Fuca Strait by Puget Sound Seattle Vessel Traffic Service, and north of Race Rocks, the Marine Communications and Traffic Services centre for the approach to Victoria Harbour is the MCTS Victoria station in Patricia Bay.

=== Outer Harbour ===
The entrance line to the Outer Harbour extends from the breakwater just south of Pier A at Ogden Point in Victoria to Macaulay Point in Esquimalt. There is a large cruise ship and cable laying ship docking facility at Ogden Point.

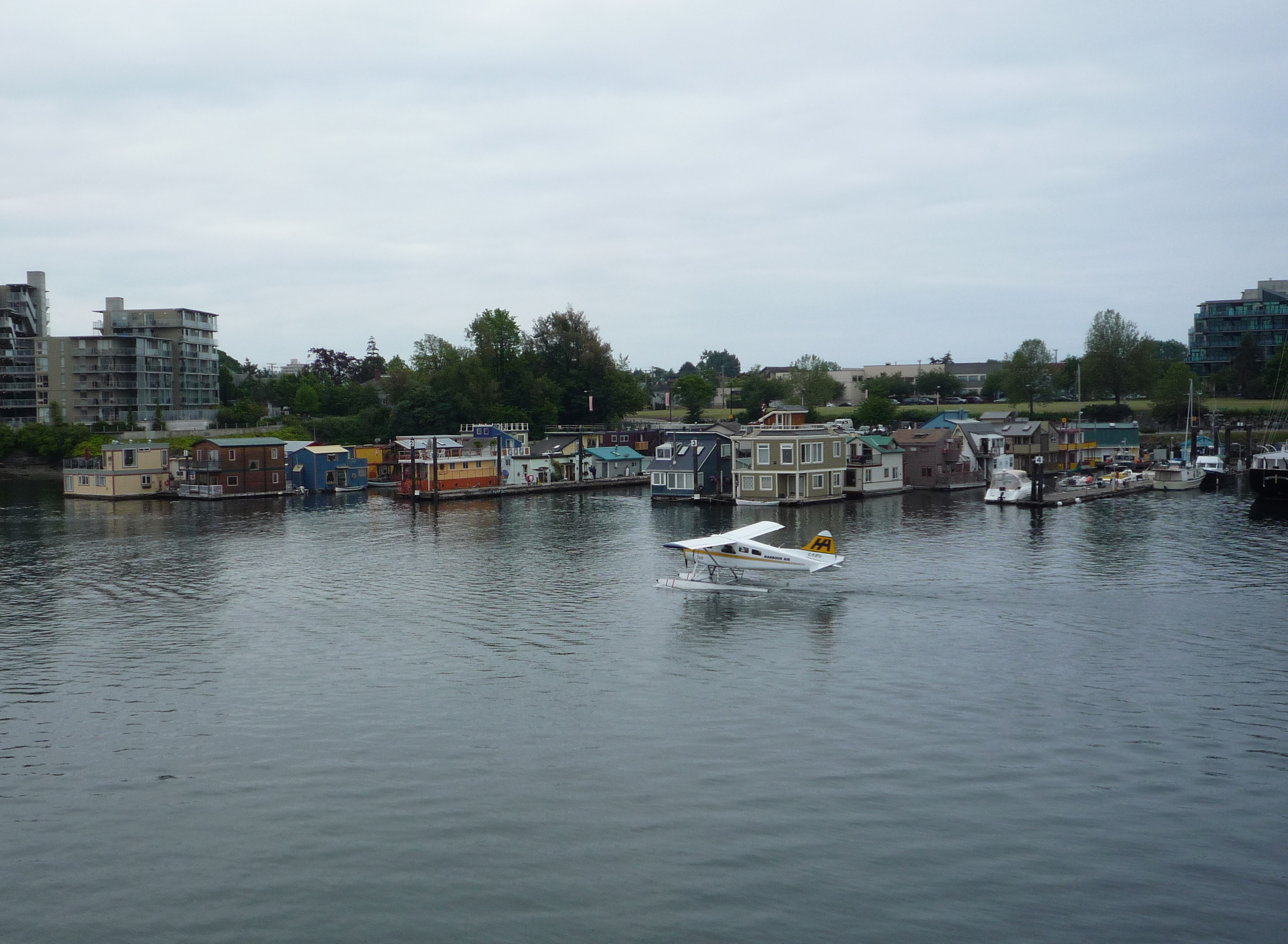
Fisherman's Wharf and Harbour Air plane, 6 June 2009

=== Middle Harbour ===
Victoria Harbour (Shoal Point) Heliport
- IATA: none; ICAO: none; TC LID: CBZ7

Summary
- Airport type: Private
- Owner: Canadian Coast Guard
- Serves: Victoria Harbour
- Location: Shoal Point
- Time zone: PST (UTC−08:00)
  - Summer (DST): PDT (UTC−07:00)
- Elevation AMSL: 10 ft (3.0 m)
- Coordinates: 48°25′23″N 123°23′15″W

Map
- Location in British Columbia

Helipads
Number	Length		Surface
Number	ft	m	Surface
1	113 x 113	34 × 34	Concrete
- Sources: Canada Flight Supplement

The Middle Harbour is entered between Shoal Point on the Victoria side and Colville Island on the Esquimalt side. It extends east to the Inner Harbour. The Victoria Canadian Coast Guard station lies on Shoal Point. The fisherman's wharf docks are in the Middle Harbour.

=== Inner Harbour ===
The Inner Harbour is entered between Laurel Point in Victoria and Songhees Point in Victoria West. It extends northeast to the Johnson Street Bridge. Within the Inner Harbour the area in front of the Empress Hotel was known as "James Bay" in the 19th century as well as in 21st century harbour traffic maps, however most tourists refer to the whole area as "Inner Harbour". Adjacent to the Causeway Floats marina in James Bay lies the Victoria neighbourhood of James Bay. Most regularly scheduled ferries and seaplanes dock within the Inner Harbour. There is a Canada Border Services Agency office at Ogden Point and another adjacent to the Inner Harbour.

Curiously, despite having offices within the City of Victoria, the British Columbia Ferry Services crown corporation offers no scheduled service to Victoria Harbour. Instead, BC Ferries serves the transportation needs of the Capital Regional District via the Swartz Bay Ferry Terminal, which is further north along the Saanich Peninsula and provides service to the mainland, as well as with the MV Mill Bay which links Brentwood Bay to the town of Mill Bay across the Saanich Inlet. Other companies do provide ferry service to the harbour (see table below).

The Inner Harbour is home to the boarding jetties for the Canadian and US airlines that use the Victoria Inner Harbour Airport. In 2007 the seaplane link from Victoria to Vancouver Harbour Water Airport was, according to the Official Airline Guide, Canada's busiest air route by the number of weekly flights. The water runways and taxiways for the airport extend out through the Middle Harbour and Outer Harbour.

Ferry services in Victoria Harbour
Company	Vessel(s)	Destination	notes
Black Ball Ferry Line	MV Coho	Port Angeles, WA	can carry cars
Clipper Navigation	Victoria Clipper, Victoria Clipper III, Victoria Clipper IV	Seattle, WA	fast catamarans
Victoria Harbour Ferry Company and H2O Taxi	12 small launches	intra harbour	seasonal tours and water taxi

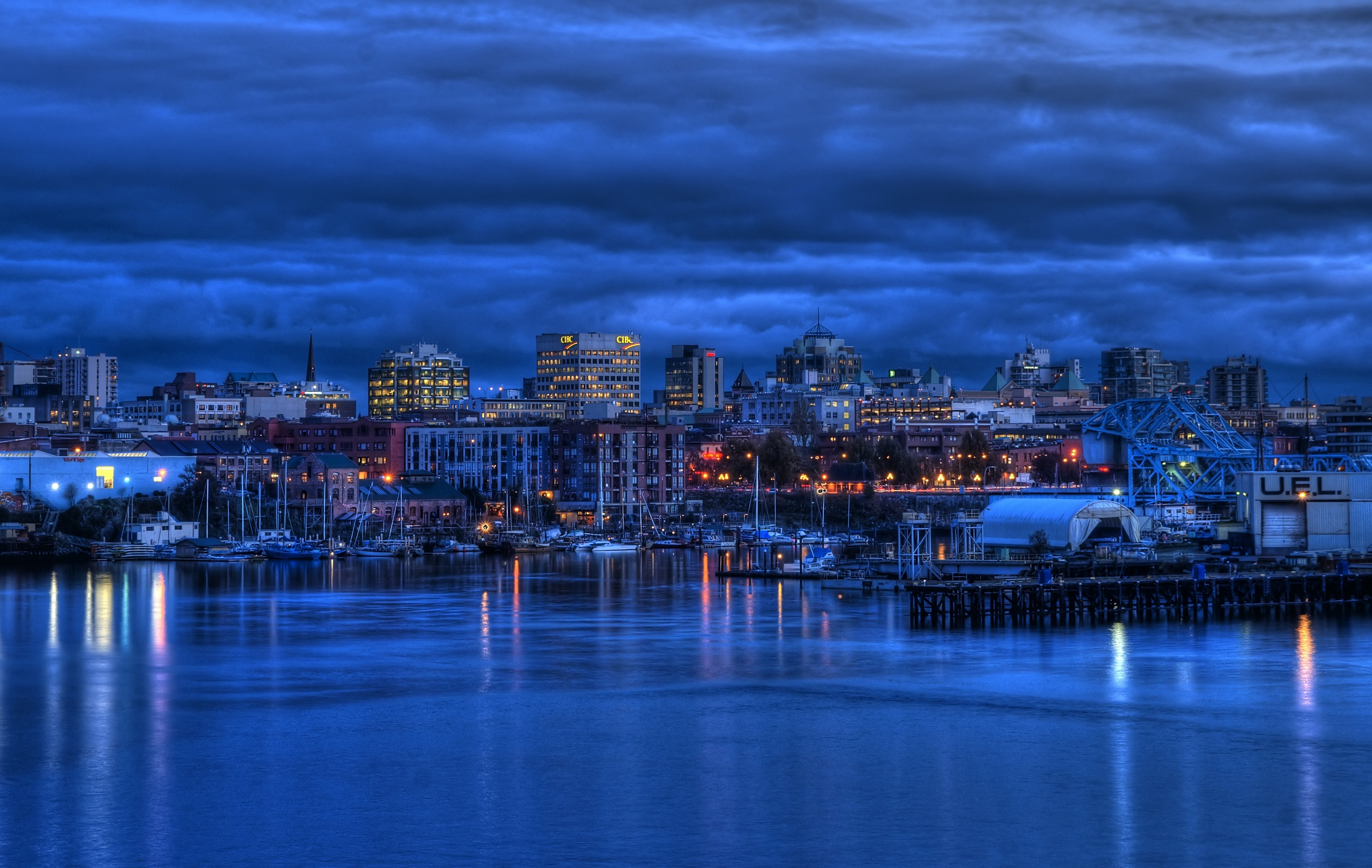
View across the Upper Harbour from the Bay Street Bridge at twilight, 15 November 2009

Former ferry services in Victoria Harbour
Company	Vessel(s)	Destination
Victoria San Juan Cruises	Victoria Star 2	Bellingham, WA
Victoria Express	Victoria Express, Victoria Express II	Port Angeles, WA

=== Upper Harbour ===
The Upper Harbour extends north from the Johnson Street Bridge to the Point Ellice Bridge (also known as the Bay Street Bridge). The small area of water in the northeast of the Upper Harbour is known as "Rock Bay". Adjacent to the Rock Bay body of water is the Rock Bay neighbourhood. The Upper Harbour is home to the Sail and Life Training Society and their topsail schooner Pacific Swift.

In 1896 a predecessor of the Bay Street Bridge was the site of a streetcar bridge collapse disaster that was one of the worst in BC history.

=== Selkirk Water ===
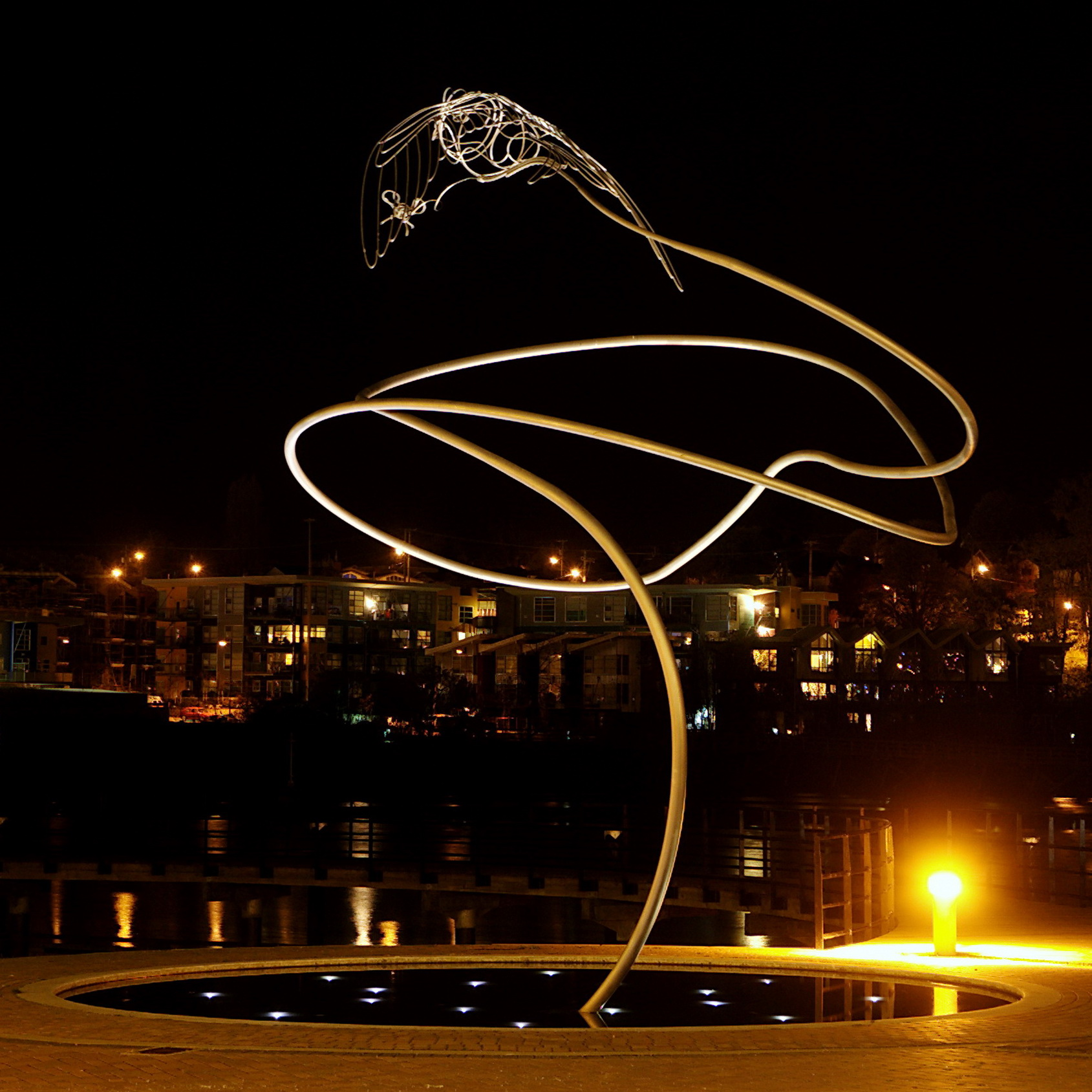
Sculpture on east shore of Selkirk Water, 11 April 2007

Selkirk Water extends northwest from the Point Ellice Bridge to Chapman Point. The Galloping Goose Regional Trail traverses Selkirk Water on a bridge known as the Selkirk Trestle that was originally built by the Canadian National Railway.

=== Gorge Waters ===
Gorge Waters, officially the Gorge Waterway, is a narrow 3 km stretch of the waterway (just 18m wide at Gorge Bridge, Tillicum Road), extending northwest from Chapman Point to Maple Point and the Craigflower Bridge. The shore of Gorge Waters is home to the Gorge Waterway Discovery Centre and the Craigflower Manor and Schoolhouse. The Victoria Canoe and Kayak Club and GO Rowing and Paddling Club are along Gorge Waters as well. Some charts split the Gorge Waters into a "Lower Gorge Waterway" and an "Upper Gorge Waterway" with the split being at the fixed the Gorge Bridge, Tillicum Road Bridge^{map3}.

The Craigflower Bridge ^{map4} is at the northwestern end of the Gorge, where the Harbour then becomes Portage Inlet. The Craigflower Bridge carries Highway 1A (locally "Admiral's Road"), linking the districts of View Royal, on the southern side, and Saanich, on the northern side. Here, on either side of the Gorge are the historic buildings which gives the bridge its name; the Craigflower Manor house, built in 1856, and the Craigflower Schoolhouse, the oldest surviving schoolhouse in Western Canada, founded in 1855. In 1997, the bridge was the site of the murder of Reena Virk.

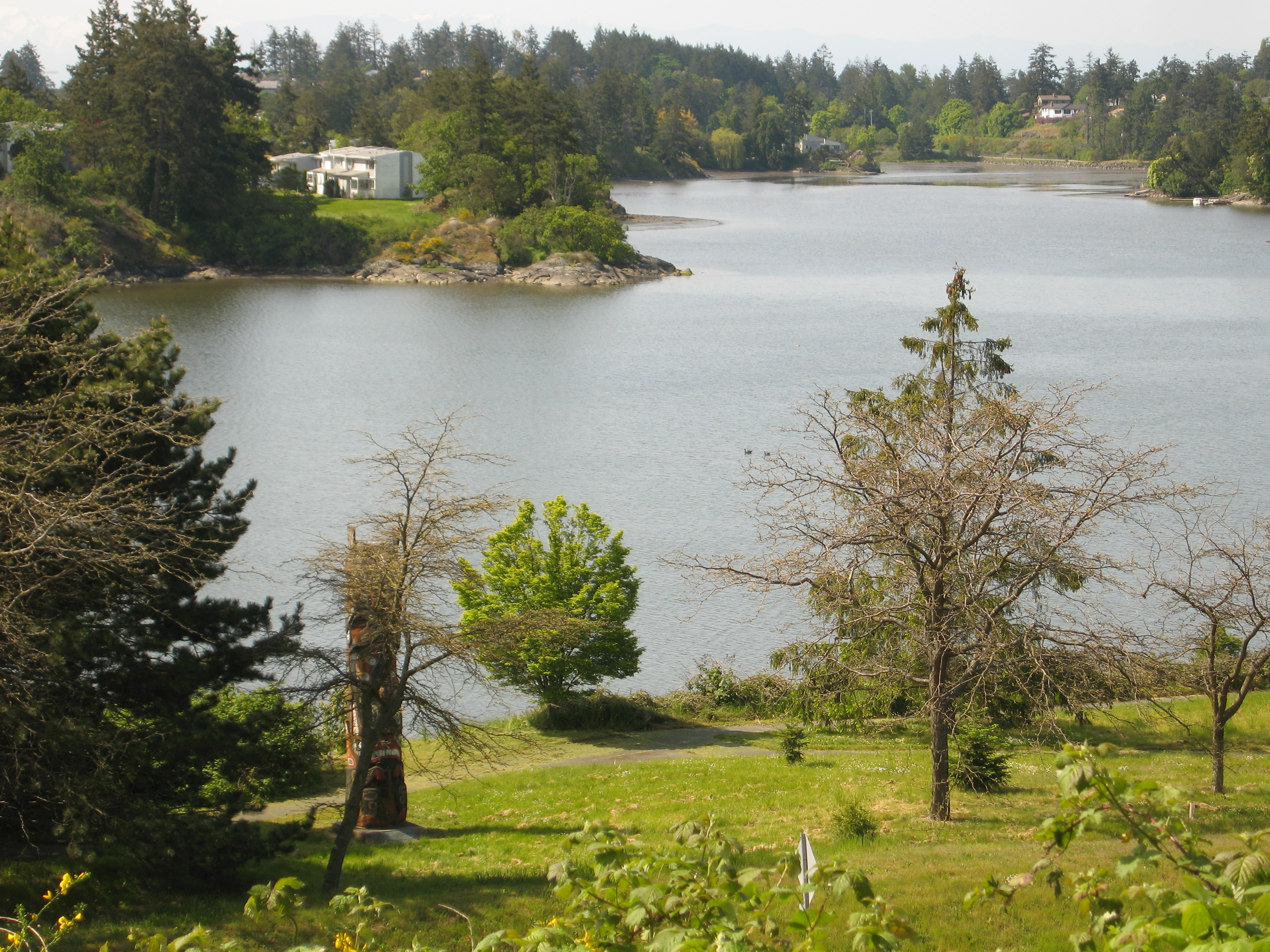
Portage Inlet as seen from the Galloping Goose Trail, May 2007

The Gorge was for many years the primary swimming location for Victoria including a tall diving platform at Curtis Point. By the 1930s the pollution levels were too high to allow for swimming. In recent years the work to clean the waterway has led to a return to swimming in the waterway.

=== Portage Inlet ===
The inner most portion of the harbour is called Portage Inlet and it extends north and west of Craigflower Bridge. The most noticeable feature of Portage Inlet seen from above is the Craigowan Road peninsula that extends into the water body north of the Shoreline Community School. Just south of Portage Inlet is the Portage Park in View Royal that runs north from Thetis Cove in Esquimalt Harbour. Flowing into Portage Inlet's northeast side is Colquitz Creek which drains Elk Lake which in turn drains O'Donnel Creek. The Victoria City Rowing Club rows at Elk Lake along with local University and High School crews.

== Facilities ==
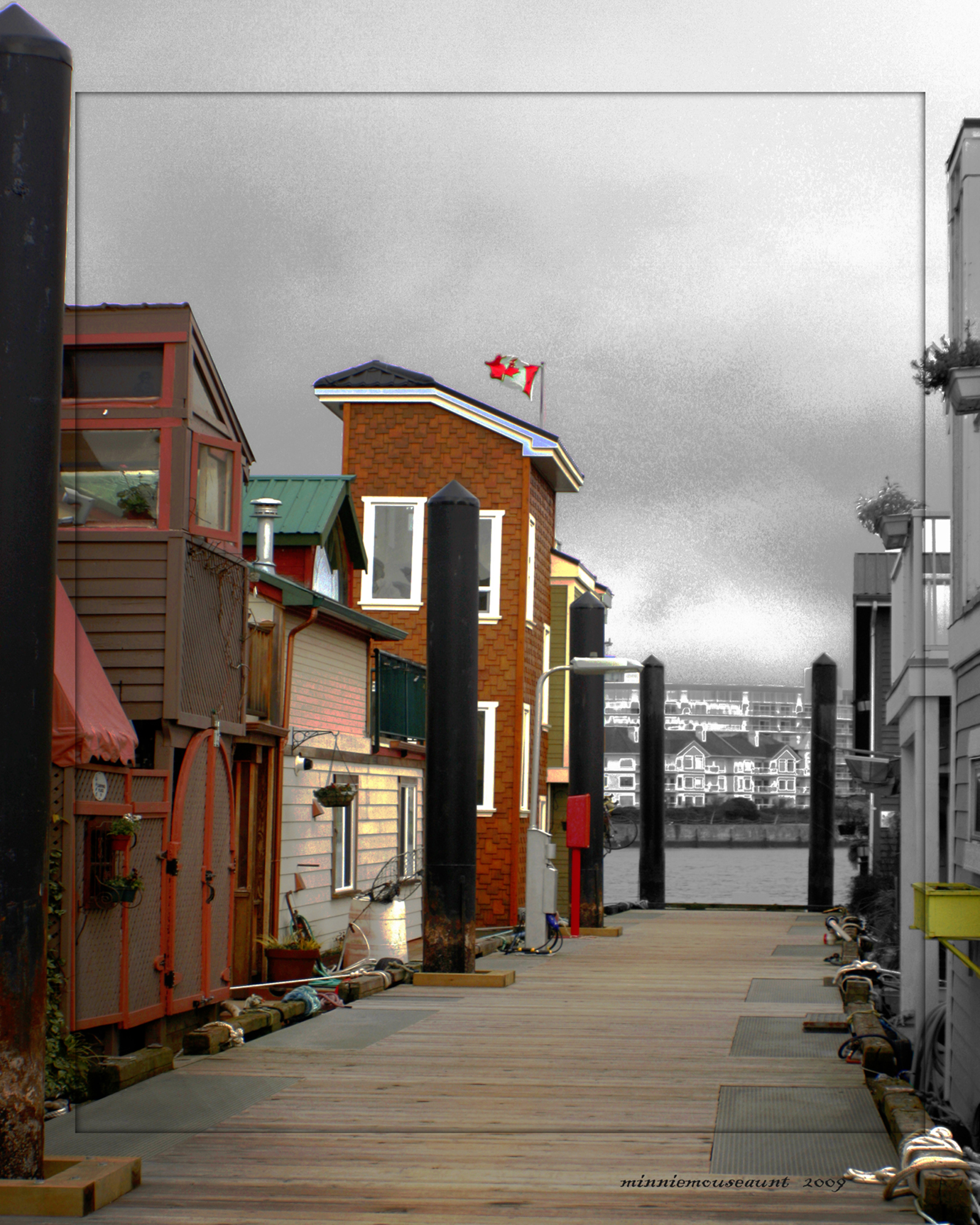
Houseboats, floating shops, and restaurants at Fisherman's Wharf, 1 December 2009

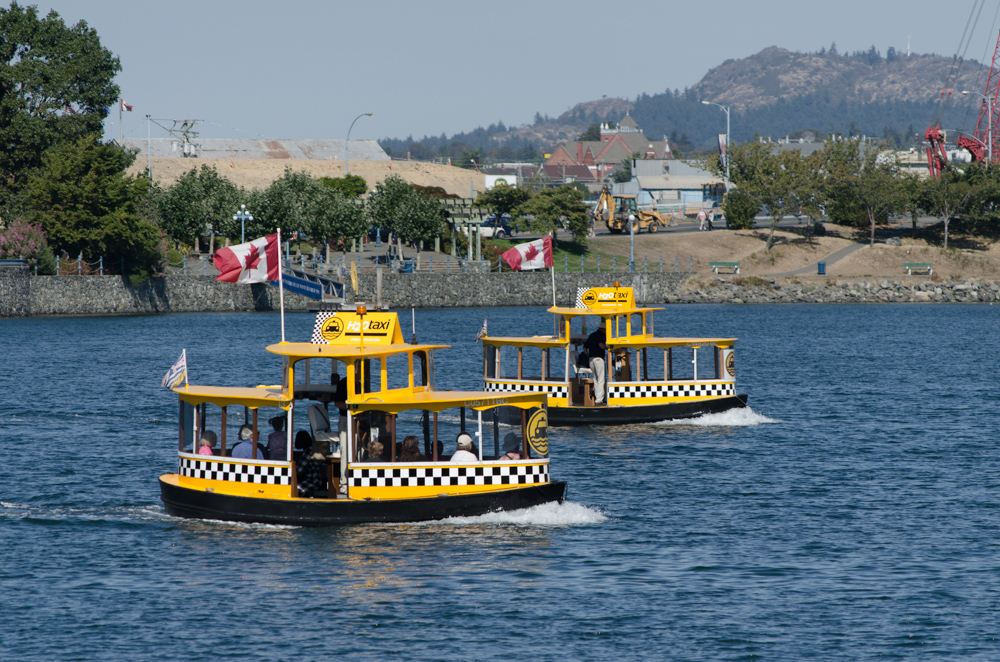
H2O Taxi boats at Victoria Harbour

The Greater Victoria Harbour Authority operates several docks and marinas in the harbour, including:

- Ogden Point - has cruise ship and break bulk cargo docks in the Outer Harbour. Vessels up to 300 m (984 ft 3 in) can be accommodated.^{map5}
- Fisherman's Wharf - is a long term and fishing vessel dock in the Middle Harbour with no transient docking. There is a GVHA fuel dock.^{map6}
- Causeway Floats - in the Inner Harbour can handle vessels up to 75 m (246 ft 1 in).^{map7}
- Ship Point - can accommodate vessels up to 75 m (246 ft 1 in) and is often used for floatplanes.^{map8}
- Wharf Street Marina - in the Inner Harbour is for transient mooring.^{map9}
- Mermaid's Wharf Marina - in the Inner Harbour is for transient mooring.^{map10}
- Johnson Street Floats - in the Inner Harbour is for transient mooring.^{map11}

In addition to the facilities owned and operated by the GVHA there are others:

- Victoria International Marina - 28-slip large-yacht (>20m/65ft) marina in middle harbour
- Westbay Marine Village - marina is in the Outer Harbour.^{map12}
- Hidden Harbour Marine Centre Ltd. - marine centre with 35 berths in West Bay of Outer Harbour
- Victoria Coast Guard Station - is on Shoal Point.^{map13}
- HMCS Malahat - is on Shoal Point.^{map14}
- Coast Harbourside Floats - 42 slip marina is part of a hotel between Raymur Point and Laurel Point in the Middle Harbour.^{map15}
- International Ferry Dock - is in the Inner Harbour.^{map16}
- Black Ball Ferry Dock - is in the Inner Harbour.^{map17}
- Pacific Undersea Gardens - is in the Inner Harbour (at former CP Ships dock).^{map18}
- Ocean Pointe Floats - are on the western side of the Inner Harbour in Victoria West.^{map19}
- Point Hope Shipyards - are along the west bank of the Upper Harbour.^{map20}
- Village Marina - is along the east bank of the Upper Harbour.^{map21}
- Canoe Marina - is on the east bank of the Upper Harbour.^{map22}
- Island Asphalt Company Barge Dock - is at Rock Bay in the Upper Harbour.^{map23}
- Butler Brothers Barge Dock - is at Rock Bay in the Upper Harbour.^{map24}
- Lafarge Barge Dock - is near Rock Bay in the Upper Harbour.^{map25}
- At one time a car float went to Ogden Point.

The graving dock at adjacent Esquimalt Harbour can drydock a Panamax sized vessel.

Operated by the James Bay Anglers at Ogden Point there is a boat ramp for trailerable boats and is open to the public for use.

== Sailing events ==
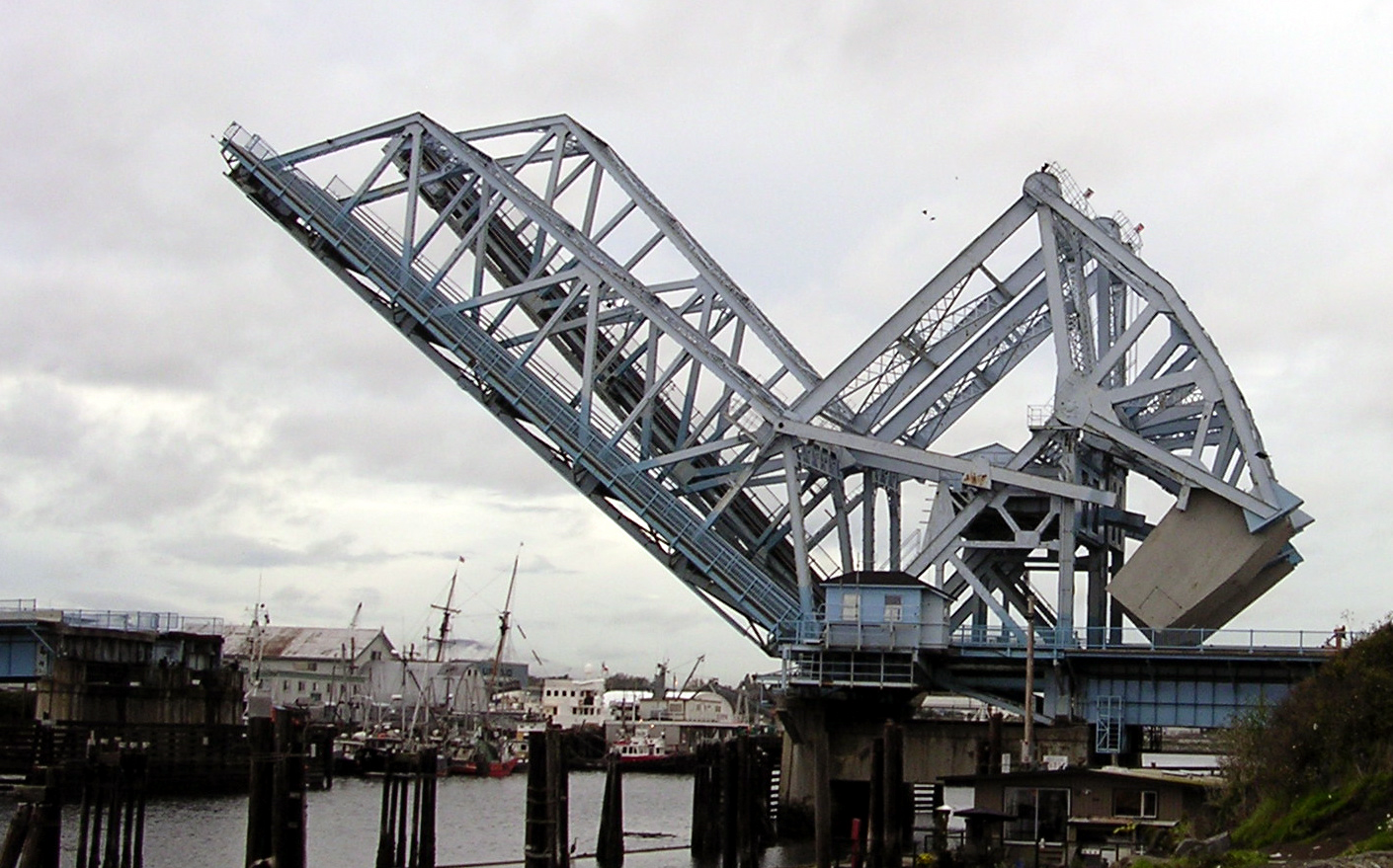
The Johnson Street Bridge's rail and road spans partially opened. In the distance the Pacific Swift is seen docked at SALTS in the Upper Harbour in 2004

Victoria Harbour is home port for a number of sailing and boating events:

- The Swiftsure Yacht Race out into the Juan de Fuca Strait and back has been held yearly since 1930 and is sponsored by the Royal Victoria Yacht Club.
- The Vic-Maui Yacht Race between Victoria and Lahaina, Hawaii has been held in even numbered years since 1968.
- The Victoria Symphony holds its annual Symphony Splash concert on BC Day staged on a barge docked in the Inner Harbour, and has been doing so since 1991. Many spectators view the concert from canoes or kayaks, as well as from boats docked at the "Causeway Floats" and "Ship Point" marinas.
- The Victoria Dragon Boat Festival has been held in the Inner Harbour annually since 1994.
- A Gorge Canada Day Picnic is held by the Gorge Tillicum Community Association and has brought more than 5,000 visitors to the parks along the Gorge Waterway on 1 July each year since 1999.
- The Victoria Tall Ships Festival has been held every third year since 2005, although the 2011 event was cancelled due to high costs of staging the festival. The festival is part of the Tall Ships Challenge event.
- Since 2000, the Gorge Rowing and Paddling Centre (GRPC) has hosted the Brotchie Reach Outrigger Canoe Races. This is a 13.4 kilometres (8.3 mi) race for OC6 (six-person outrigger canoe) and small boats (OC1, canoe-kayak, surf-ski). The race hosts up to 200 paddling racers each year - the race course starts at GRPC on the Gorge Waterway then transits through Victoria's Inner, Middle, and Outer Harbours out to the Brotchie Navigational marker and back.

== Ecology ==
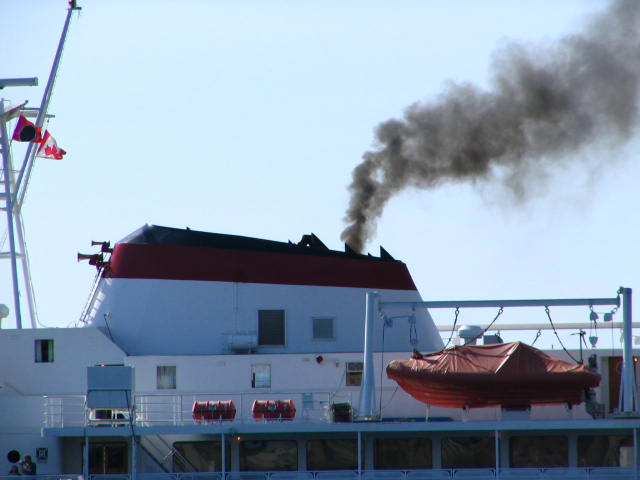
The stack of the MV Coho releasing smoke at Victoria Harbour, 2005

Despite the small size of the watershed land area of the Victoria and Saanich Peninsulas, Victoria Harbour is an estuary.

Some of the fresh water tributaries of the harbour include:

- Colquitz Creek
  - Beaver Lake
    - Elk Lake
      - O'Donnel Creek
  - Durrell Creek
  - Swan Lake Creek
    - Swan Lake
      - Blenkinsop Lake
- Craigflower Creek
  - Thetis Lakes (Upper and Lower)
- Cecelia Creek
- James Bay Creek (this tributary now runs in culverts under landfill, see also Beacon Hill Park)

In Portage Inlet there are 70 ha (170 acres) of eelgrass growing under water. Portage Inlet and the Gorge Waterway may also be home to the largest colony of Pacific oysters on the west coast. Craigflower Creek and Colquitz Creek are spawning grounds primarily for Coho salmon. Pacific herring also use Portage Inlet and the Gorge Waterway for spawning.

Victoria Harbour was recognized as a Migratory Bird Sanctuary in 1923. The Upper and Lower Thetis Lakes, which discharge into Portage Inlet, were Canada's first nature sanctuary in 1958.

In 1965 the city of Victoria started using the former Mud Bay on the south shore of Victoria West as a garbage dump. When Mud Bay was filled in it was superseded by the Hartland landfill.

In 1998 the Cecelia Creek Clean Up Committee was formed to work on restoring the environment in and around the Cecelia Creek that flows into Selkirk Water.

Between 2002 and 2006 Transport Canada spent over $4 million to clean up properties in the harbour to stricter environmental standards. BC Hydro and the Federal Government have undertaken a $2 million clean-up of the eastern shore of Rock Bay which was once the site of a coal gasification plant. The plant had been the last run by the Victoria Gas Company which had started in 1860 and was one of the forerunners of BC Hydro.

Through the coordination and services of the Capital Regional District (CRD) the municipalities of Colwood, Esquimalt, Langford, Oak Bay, Saanich, Victoria, and View Royal discharged an average of 129,000,000 L (105 acre⋅ft) of filtered but untreated sewage into the ocean every day in 2006. At two filtration facilities (Clover Point in Victoria and Macauley Point in Esquimalt) sewage is screened to exclude objects larger than 6 millimetres before being released into the Juan de Fuca Strait via marine outfalls. Solid matter that is filtered out of the effluent is trucked to the Hartland landfill. In 2006 Barry Penner, BC Minister of Environment at the time, concluded that wastewater treatment should be taking place in Victoria and surrounding communities. The CRD has started planning the construction of wastewater treatment plants.

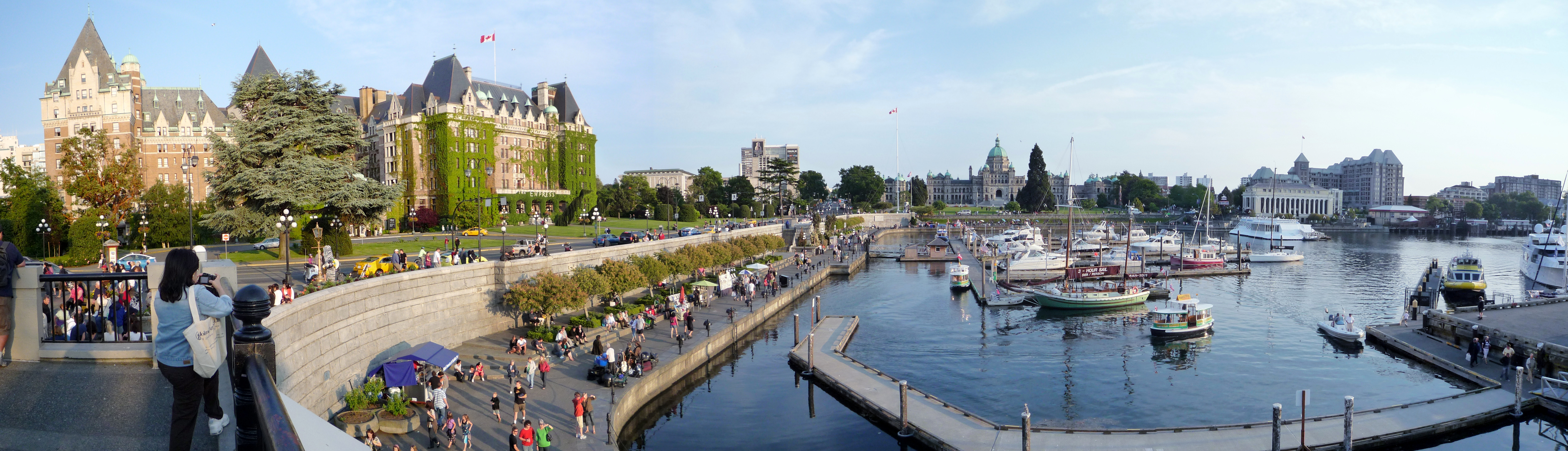
The Inner Harbour and James Bay are popular with tourists. The major buildings, from left to right, are The Fairmont Empress, Royal British Columbia Museum, British Columbia Parliament Buildings, Pacific Undersea Gardens (white building floating on water), the Royal London Wax Museum (originally the Canadian Pacific Railway Steamship Terminal, also by Francis Rattenbury), Grand Pacific Hotel, and the terminal for Blackball Transport's MV Coho ferry (5 June 2009).

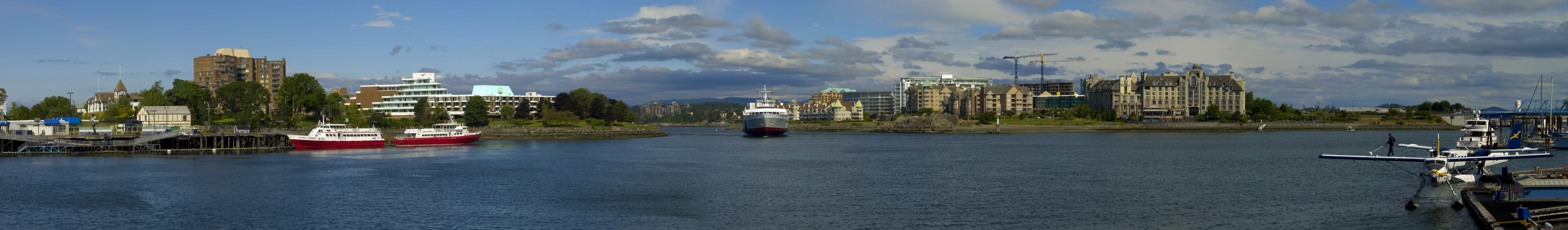
The MV Coho coming in from the Middle Harbour. Red hulled ferries Victoria Express and Victoria Express II docked at Laurel Point appear on the left in the Inner Harbour. New condominiums on Songhees Point in Victoria West appear in the centre. Docked seaplanes appear on the right and the Johnson Street Bridge is in the distance to the right (17 June 2007).

== See also ==
- Discovery Island Light
- Royal eponyms in Canada

== Maps ==
- ^map1 Albert Head - 48°23′00″N 123°29′00″W
- ^map2 Trial Islands - 48°23′53″N 123°18′20″W
- ^map3 Tillicum Road Bridge - 48°26′47″N 123°24′01″W
- ^map4 Craigflower Bridge - 48°27′08″N 123°25′23″W
- ^map5 Ogden Point Pier B - 48°25′00″N 123°23′24″W
- ^map6 Fisherman's Wharf - 48°25′22″N 123°23′01″W
- ^map7 Causeway Floats - James Bay - 48°25′19″N 123°22′12″W
- ^map8 Ship Point - 48°25′23″N 123°22′16″W
- ^map9 Wharf Street Marina - 48°25′29″N 123°22′18″W
- ^map10 Mermaid's Wharf - 48°25′35″N 123°22′17″W
- ^map11 Johnson Street Floats - 48°25′38″N 123°22′17″W
- ^map12 Westbay Marina - 48°25′36″N 123°23′45″W
- ^map13 Victoria Coast Guard Station - 48°25′13″N 123°23′20″W
- ^map14 HMCS Malahat - 48°25′22″N 123°23′12″W
- ^map15 Coast Harbourside Floats - 48°25′24″N 123°22′46″W
- ^map16 International Ferry Dock - 48°25′22″N 123°22′26″W
- ^map17 Black Ball Ferry Dock - 48°25′18″N 123°22′19″W
- ^map18 Pacific Undersea Gardens - 48°25′18″N 123°22′15″W
- ^map19 Ocean Point Floats - 48°25′36″N 123°22′27″W
- ^map20 Point Hope Shipyards - 48°25′49″N 123°22′25″W
- ^map21 Village Marina - 48°25′50″N 123°22′18″W
- ^map22 Canoe Marina - 48°25′46″N 123°22′18″W
- ^map23 Island Asphalt Barge Dock - 48°25′59″N 123°22′20″W
- ^map24 Butler Brothers Barge Dock - 48°26′03″N 123°22′24″W
- ^map25 Lafarge Barge Dock - 48°26′01″N 123°22′36″W
