= Bay Street Substation =

Coordinates: 48.4356°N 123.3668°W

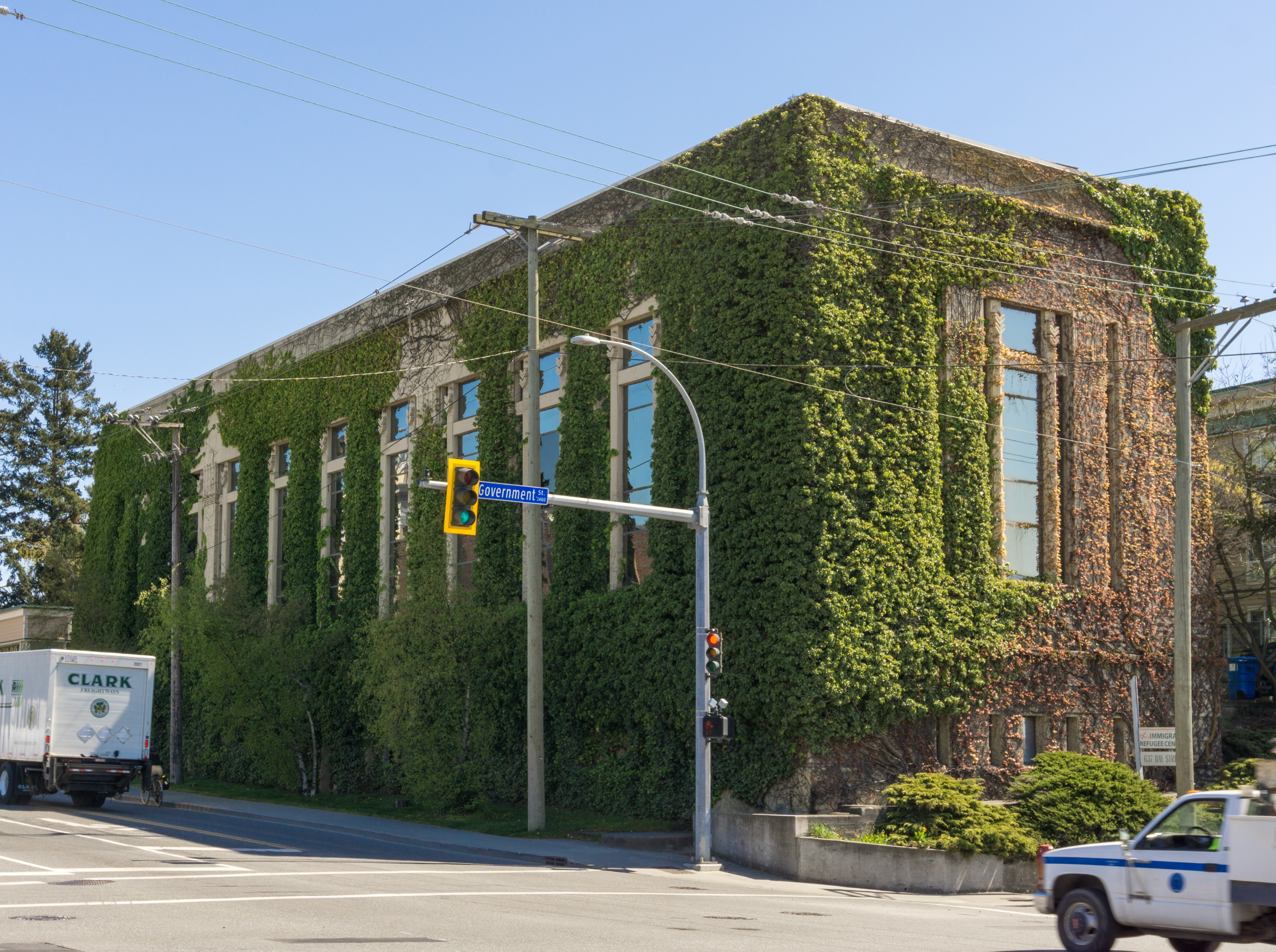
- The building's exterior in 2018
- Interactive map of the Bay Street Substation area

General information
- Location: Victoria, British Columbia, Canada

The Bay Street Substation is an historic building in Victoria, British Columbia, Canada. It is located downtown, at the intersection of Bay and Government Streets.

== See also ==
- List of historic places in Victoria, British Columbia
