= Point Ellice Bridge =

Bridge over Victoria Harbour, British Columbia, Canada

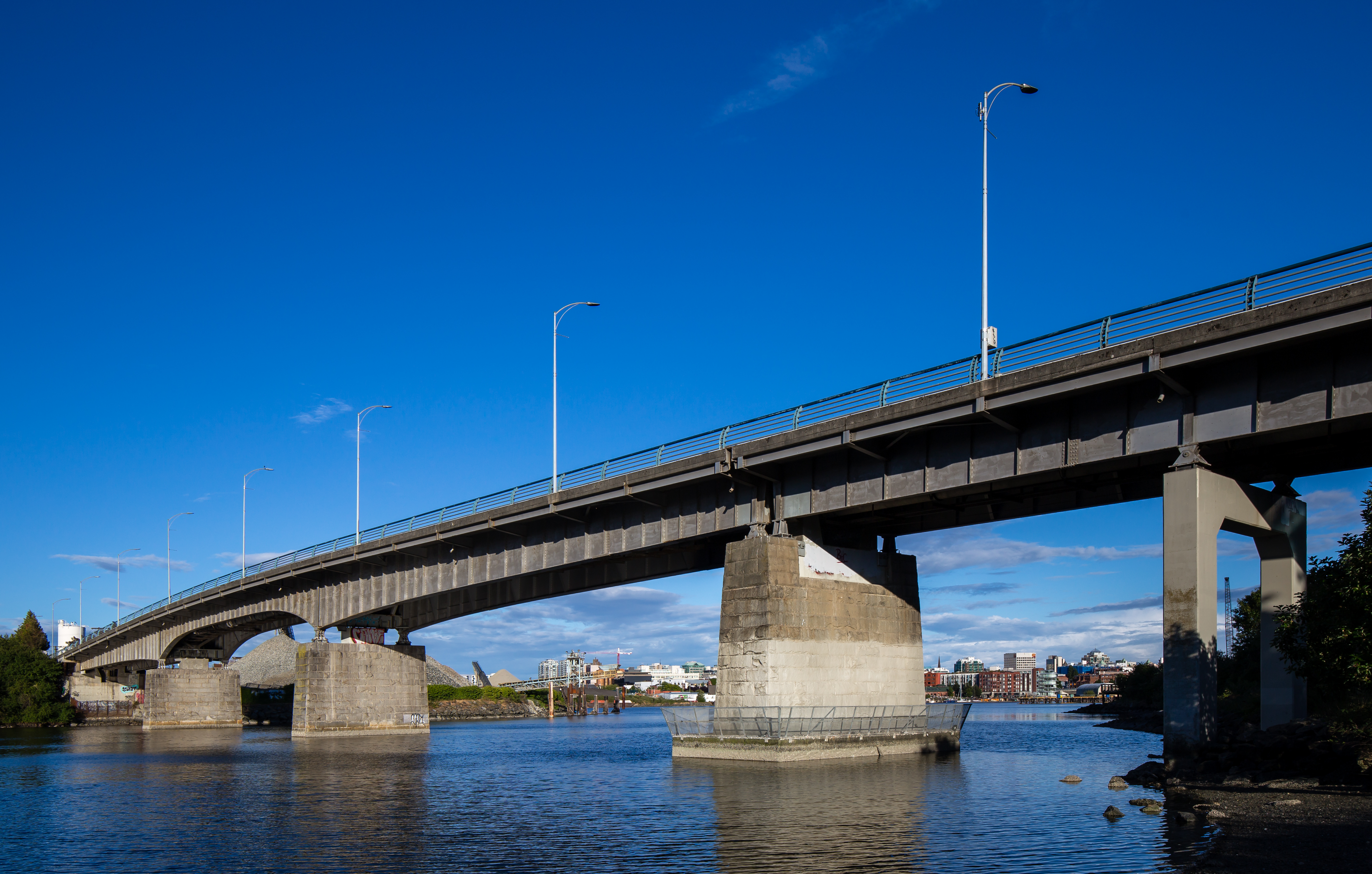
- Coordinates: 48.43432°N 123.37826°W
- Crosses: Victoria Harbour (British Columbia)
- Locale: Victoria, British Columbia
- Other name: Bay Street Bridge

History
- Construction start: 1956
- Opened: November 1957

Location
- Interactive map of Point Ellice Bridge

The Point Ellice Bridge, also known as the Bay Street Bridge, is a major road-crossing of the Victoria Harbour in Victoria, British Columbia.

Used mainly by motorists, it connects the downtown Rock Bay neighbourhood with Victoria West.

It is one of few crossings toward Esquimalt, the others being the Johnson Street Bridge to the south, the pedestrian Selkirk Trestle 600 metres to the north, and the two bridges over the Gorge Waterway, the Gorge Bridge carrying Tillicum Road, 2 km northwest of Point Ellice Bridge, and the Craigflower Bridge carrying Admirals Road, a further 1.8 km west.

In 1896 it was the site of the Point Ellice Bridge disaster, when the unmaintained bridge collapsed, killing 55 people.

The current structure was built in 1956–57 and was subject to major upgrades in 2001–02 and 2019, during which it was closed to traffic for 5 months.

Plans to widen the bridge to better accommodate cyclists were originally developed in 2001, at an estimated price of $15,250,000.

== See also ==
- Point Ellice House
- List of bridges in Canada
