= Pacific Undersea Gardens =

Coordinates: 48°25′17.36″N 123°22′14.26″W

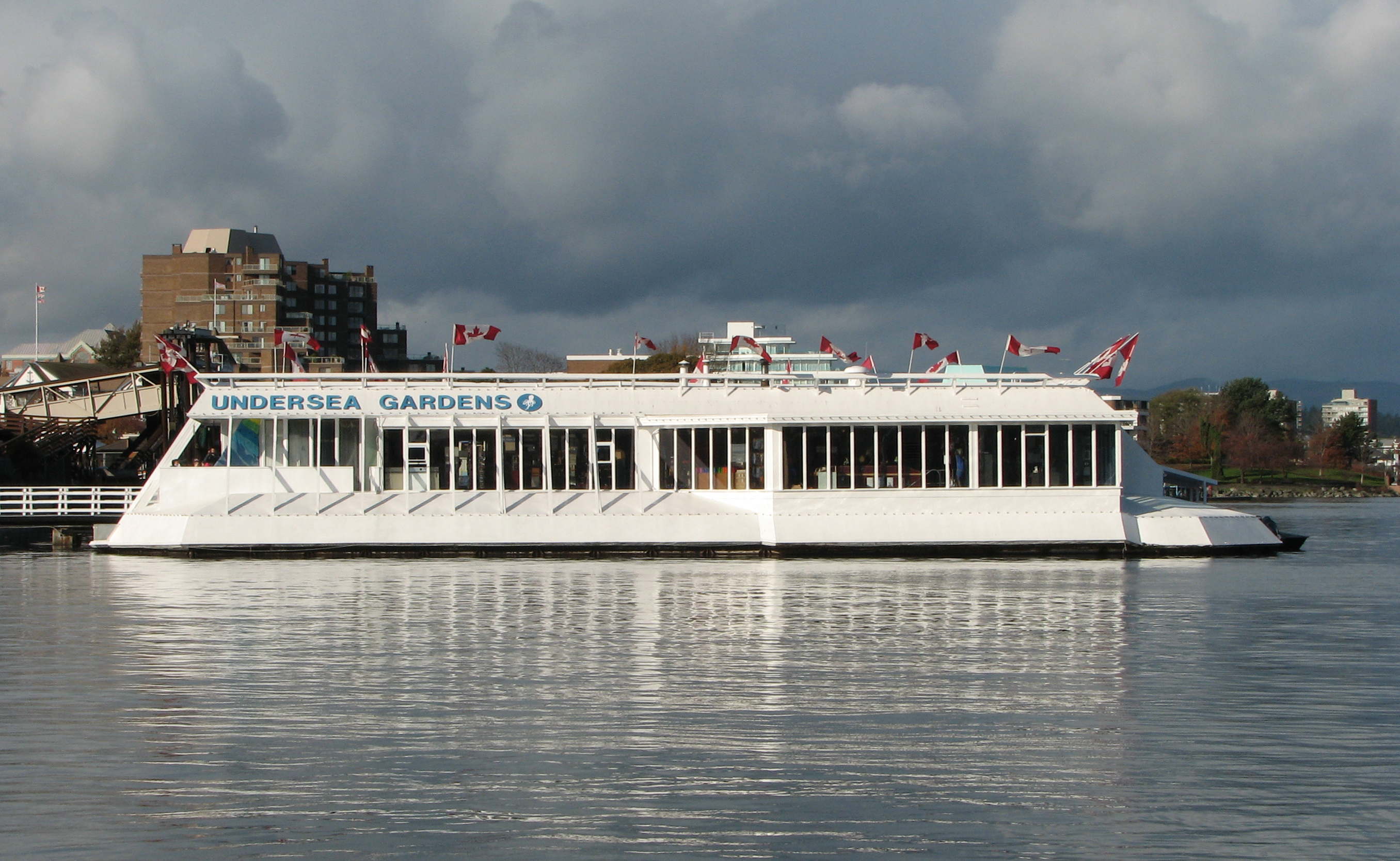
Pacific Undersea Gardens

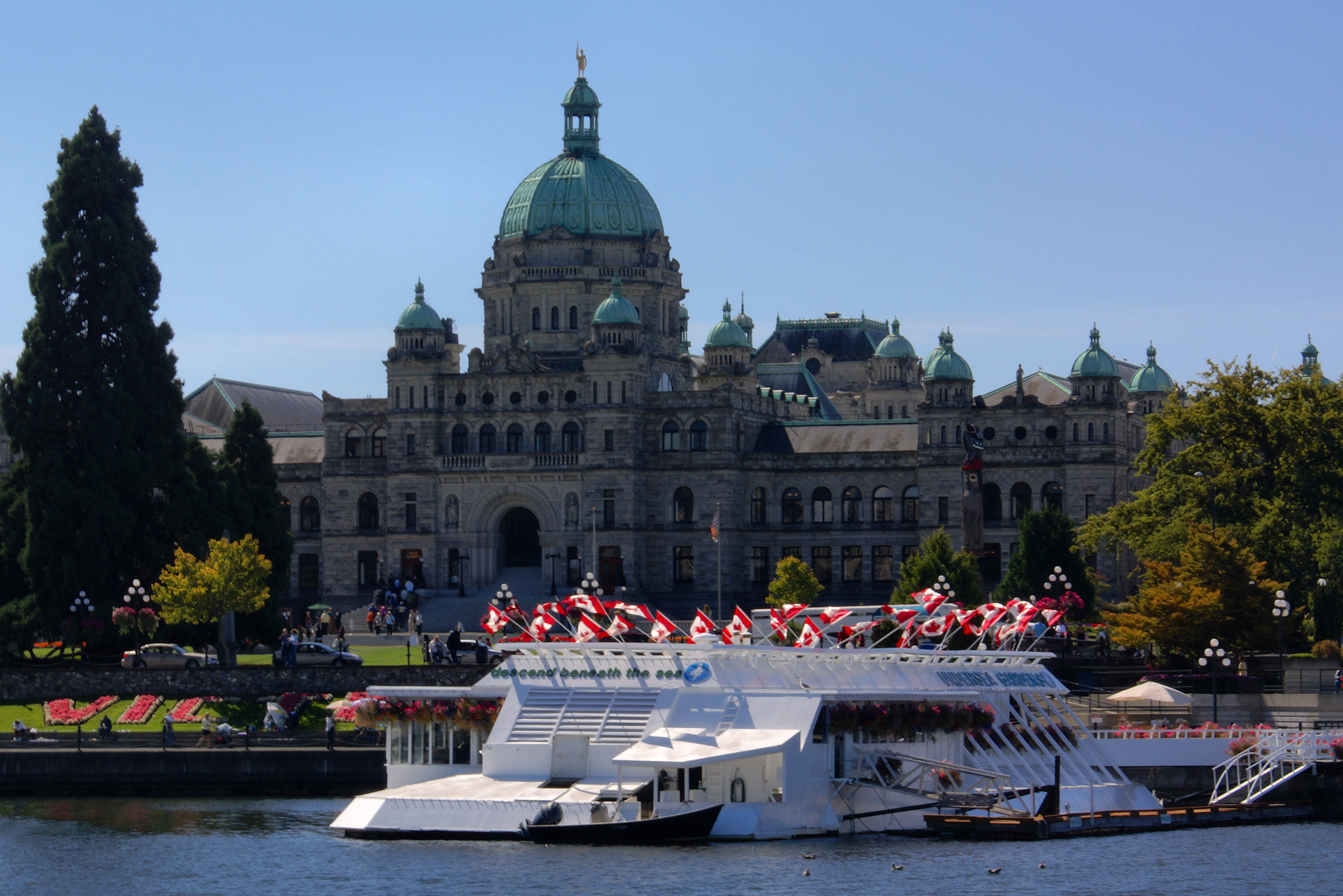
Pacific Undersea Gardens (BC Legislature Buildings also pictured)

The Pacific Undersea Gardens was located at the Inner Harbour in the heart of downtown Victoria. The Gardens were owned and operated by the Oak Bay Marine Group.

== Features ==
The Pacific Undersea Gardens was a 150-foot (45 m) vessel that was towed from the Oak Bay Marina to the waters of the Inner Harbour. Visitors descended 15 feet (4.5 m) beneath the ocean surface to look through the many viewing windows of the aquariums that surrounded the vessel and see the various marine life of coastal British Columbia, in their natural and protected environment. The Gardens also had a tidal pond full of Sea stars and Sea Anemones where visitors were allowed to gently touch the animals.

Located at the end of the 150-foot (45 m) vessel of the Undersea Gardens was the Undersea Theatre. In the theatre, seating was provided where visitors would sit down and watch the show from the viewing windows of the aquarium. In the actual show, a guide would welcome them and narrate the show to explain the different wildlife in the aquarium.

A diver was also in the show with an equipped full-face communication mask in the water to guide you, as well, and handle the different animals that were in the theatre aquarium such as Crabs, Sea Urchins, Sea stars, Sea Anemones, Cabezon and Lingcod. However, the two main attractions of the theatre were the Wolf Eels and a Giant Pacific Octopus named "Armstrong". The Undersea Theatre show was 20 minutes long, making the daily total tour time around 45 to 60 minutes.

== Marine Life and Exhibits ==
The Pacific Undersea Gardens housed more than 5,000 different species of British Columbia's marine life. The different marine life at the Gardens included different types of fish, Crabs, Sea stars, Sea Anemones, Sea Urchins, Sea Cucumbers, Scallops, Wolf Eels and the Giant Pacific Octopus.

In one exhibit, fish, such as the Red Snapper, Rock Fish, Cabezon, Lingcod, Greenlings, Sculpins, Perch and Halibut, swam through the kelp forest, as they were surrounded by different Sea stars, Anemones and Crabs.

In another exhibit, there was a school of about a thousand Pacific Salmon as they swam along the ruins of a sunken ship. In this exhibit the actual life cycle of the salmon took place as they laid eggs and gave birth to young.

In addition, there was another exhibit that was surrounded by a ghostly gardens of white and crimson Anemones. Amongst the surrounding anemones, there was the ferocious looking Wolf Eel as it lurked around the ocean and gliding through the reef was the Giant Pacific Octopus, which is the largest octopus in the world.

== Events ==
Every year, the Pacific Undersea Gardens and their volunteers got organized to start their annual Clean-Up of Victoria's Inner Harbour. The volunteers included the Pacific Navy Fleet Diving Unit, the Coast Guard Auxiliary 35 Unit and the area's local divers. This operation took months to organize, but was usually done within two hours. During the diving expedition to clean up the harbour, divers once removed about a hundred pounds (45 kg) of garbage. Some of the garbage had included suitcases, pants, bicycles, tires, boat batteries, cell-phones, shoes and a toilet.

== History ==
Undersea Gardens was designed by Charles White in 1963. By 1976 the tour was operating in four Pacific coast cities: Victoria, B.C., Newport, Oregon, and two in California.

Charles White was a biologist and photographer who had previously worked for the Oregon Fish Commission studying salmon and as a charter fishing guide on Vancouver Island. "His love of fish and marine life led him to conceive and develop [the tour]".

He was the author of the book How to Catch Salmon: Basic Fundamentals which was very widely read.

Pacific Undersea Gardens was originally opened at the Oak Bay Marina in 1964, and later relocated to its current location in Victoria's inner harbour in 1969. Its last day of operation was October 17, 2013. It was closed due to age and the high cost of improvements that would be required to bring it up to code. Following its closure and removal from the Inner Harbour, the space it formerly occupied has since been taken over by the V2V ferry, which is a 3 hour, luxury, walk-on passenger only ferry to downtown Vancouver.
