= Point Ellice Bridge disaster =

1896 tram accident in Canada

Coordinates: 48°26′3.32″N 123°22′41.14″W

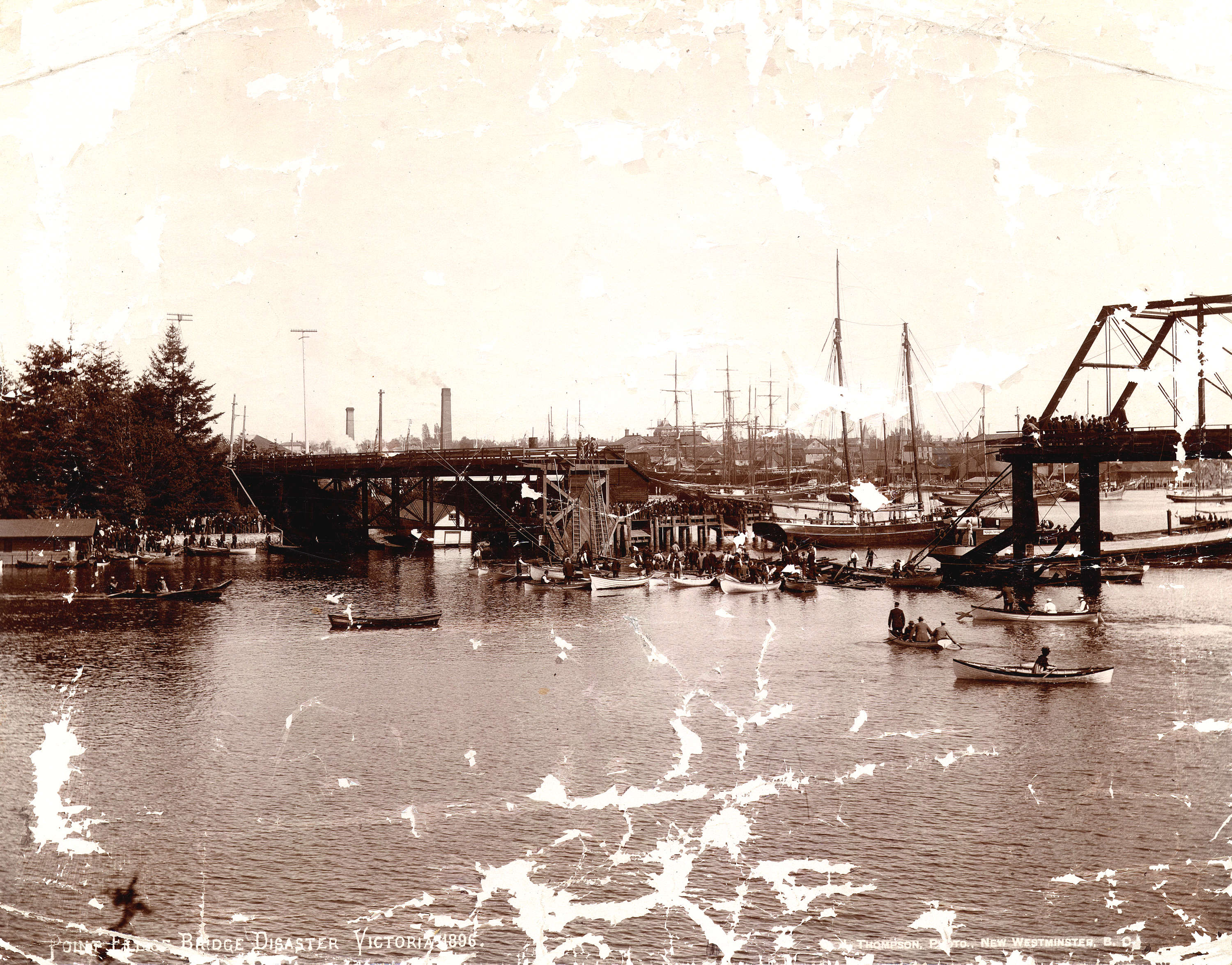
Aftermath of the Point Ellice Bridge disaster on May 26, 1896.

The Point Ellice Bridge disaster occurred on May 26, 1896, in Victoria, British Columbia, when a streetcar crowded with 143 passengers on their way to attend celebrations of Queen Victoria's birthday crashed through Point Ellice Bridge into the Upper Harbour. 55 people were killed in the accident, making it one of the worst transit disasters in British Columbia. Only passengers on the left side of the streetcar escaped.

The Consolidated Electric Railway Company, who operated Victoria's streetcar system at the time, was forced into receivership by the disaster and emerged reorganized as the British Columbia Electric Railway on April 15, 1897.

== Bridge collapse ==
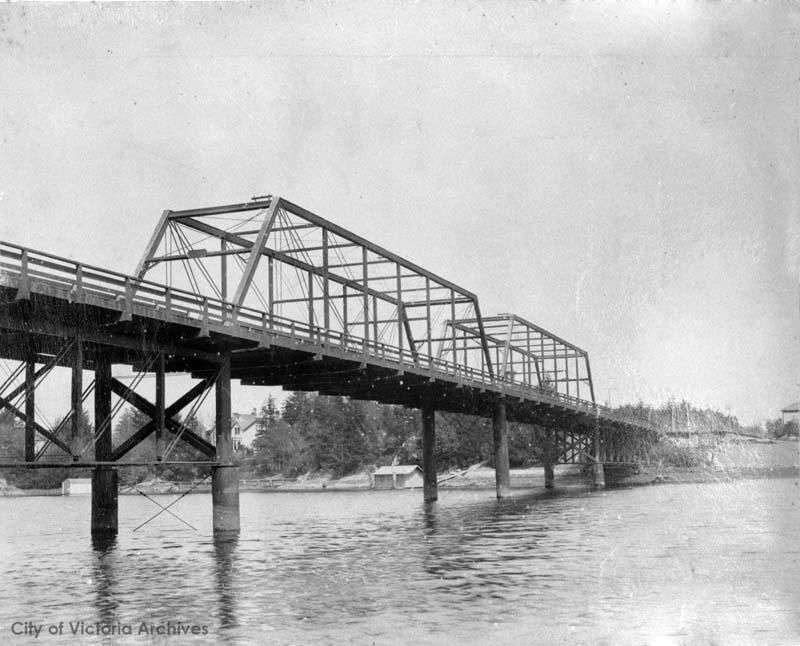
Point Ellice Bridge before it collapsed

On May 26, 1896, just before 2:00 pm the Consolidated Electric Railway Company's No. 16 streetcar passed over the Point Ellice Bridge. It was overburdened with 143 passengers on their way to view the naval battles that were occurring in Esquimalt in celebration of Queen Victoria's birthday. Due to lacking safety standards, poor bridge maintenance, and the overcrowded streetcar, the bridge collapsed causing the streetcar to crash into the water. The 143 occupants of the streetcar, as well as two other horse-led vehicles and a man on a bicycle who was crossing the bridge at the same time, fell into the water.

The register that recorded trolley fares had recorded that 98 fares had been collected, however it is believed that the conductor had not finished collecting fares when the collapse occurred.

== Rescue efforts ==
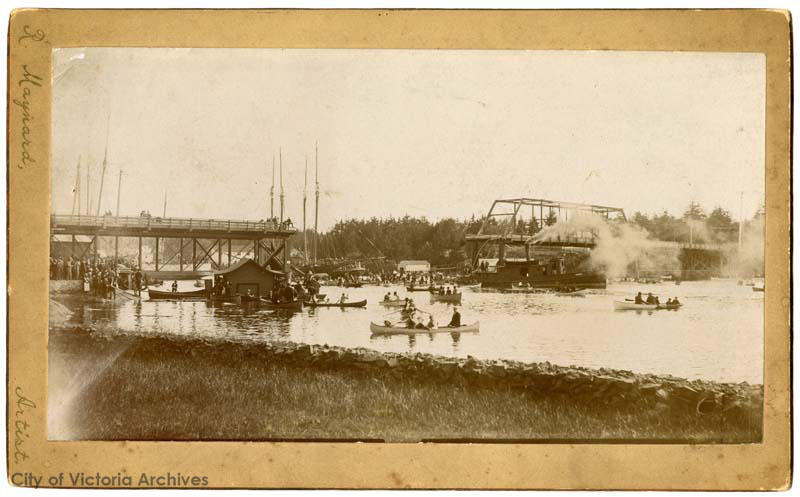
Small boats are seen in the water at the Point Ellice Bridge disaster, presumably rescuing survivors.

Seeing the streetcar plunge into the water, many bystanders leapt into action. According to the Daily Colonist on May 27, the day after the collapse:

"The hour was not without its heroes who were quick to think and act, and to these heroes, women and men, the salvation of many lives from the waters is due, as well as the winning back from death of many who had to all appearances passed into the shadowland. The work of rescuers lasted through all the afternoon, and by evening the greater number of bodies had been recovered, although it is practically certain that yet others are still to be removed from the fatal waters."

Many of homeowners who owned property at Point Ellice are recorded as having seen or heard the collapse and jumped into action to aid in rescue efforts. The daughters of Mr. Justice Drake of the Tyrwhitt-Drake residence are credited with pulling seven people from the water. The Grant residence at 304 Bay street was used a primary area for recovering both the living and dead. The dead were laid out on the lawn, and the living were taken into the drawing room where Mrs. Grant had worked quickly to turn it into an infirmary. Other neighbours are recorded as having brought: "blankets, brandy and other restoratives." The Daily Colonist remarked:

"It was wonderful how coolly and energetically men and women worked. Class distinctions and all were forgotten. Delicate ladies whom one might expect to shrink from scenes of horror aided the work of resuscitating the unfortunate victims as one by one they were brought ashore and laid on the lawns of Capt. Grant's house. It was an awful sight as one motionless form after another was brought up on the steep back and placed upon the grass."

== Aftermath ==
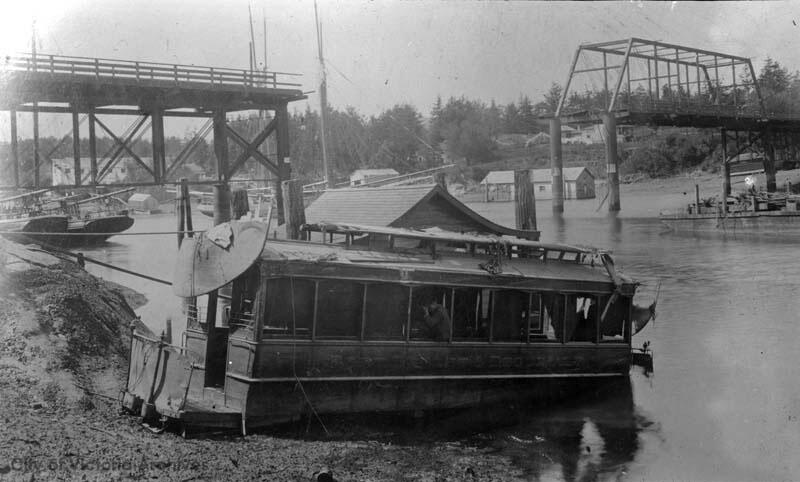
Consolidated Railway and Lighting Company car no. 16 in the water following the disaster.

On the day of the collapse 47 people were recorded as having died, but as the debris of the streetcar was removed and search efforts continued the number of dead rose to 55. Men, women, and children from Port Townsend, Seattle, Tacoma, Victoria, and Vancouver were among the deceased.

According to a diary entry written by Peter O'Reilly nearly one year after the bridge disaster he remarks on how he believed that his eldest daughter Kathleen was on the bridge when it collapsed:

"Yesterday the Queen’s birthday was kept, but very quietly – no regatta, no racing, no nothing – I believe...Tomorrow the 26th a day never to be forgotten, when I believed for a while that I have lost my darling child but by gods' miracle she was spared."

A letter to Kathleen O'Reilly from Harry Stanhope discusses how the London papers had reported of a death of an O'Reilly, though this was later retracted.

On June 12, 1896, a coroner's jury concluded that the tramway operator, the Consolidated Electric Railway Company, was responsible for the disaster because it allowed its streetcar to be loaded with a much greater weight of passengers than the bridge was designed to support. The city council of Victoria was found to be guilty of contributory negligence because the bridge had not been well maintained, and because council failed to take steps to restrict the traffic on the bridge to within safe limits. The design and construction of the bridge was also found to have been poor, especially in that the specifications called for weldless iron to be used, but the ironwork was almost all welded.

== Point Ellice Bridge ==
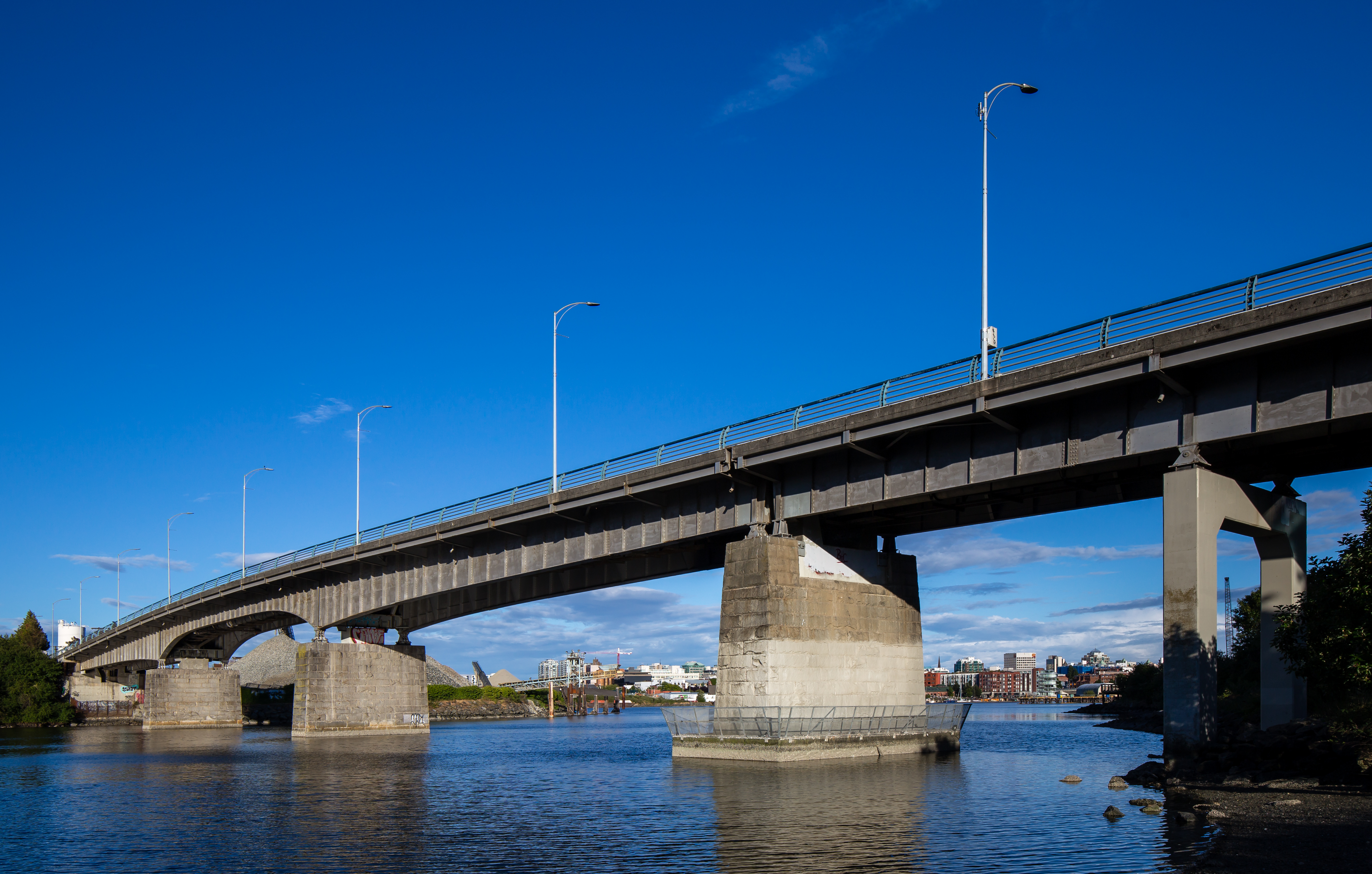
The modern Bay Street Bridge that replaced the Point Ellice Bridge, Victoria, British Columbia

The Point Ellice Bridge connects the two halves of Bay Street between Victoria and Victoria West and spans the Upper Harbour at the same location today. It marks where the Upper Harbour ends and the Selkirk Water begins.

Point Ellice, and the Point Ellice Bridge, were named for Edward Ellice who joined the North West Company in 1805 and was largely responsible for its decision to merge with the Hudson's Bay Company. He went on to a political career in England and was deputy governor of the HBC from 1858 to 1863.

== See also ==
- List of tram accidents
- List of disasters in Canada by death toll
- Bay Street (Victoria, British Columbia)
