= Bay Street (Victoria, British Columbia) =

Arterial road in Victoria, British Columbia, Canada

Bay Street is an east–west arterial road in Victoria, British Columbia. On the east side the road extends through the grounds of the Royal Jubilee Hospital to Lee Avenue and on the west side at Catherine Street in Victoria West. The Point Ellice Bridge is the bridge that Bay Street uses to cross the Upper Harbour. The Bay Street Armoury is situated on the street.
