= Old Victoria Custom House =

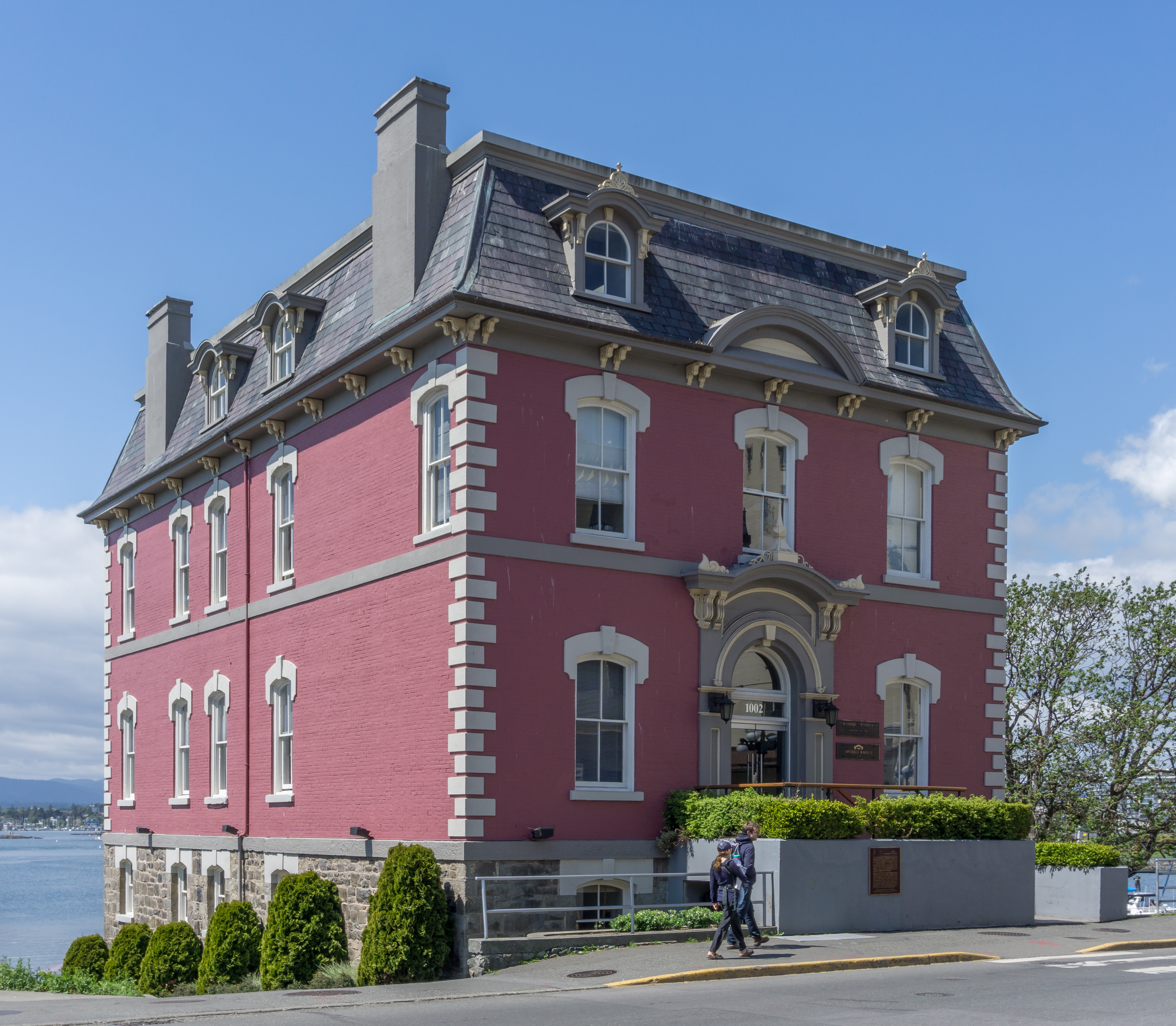
- Old Victoria Custom House in 2012
- Interactive map of the Old Victoria Custom House area

General information
- Location: Victoria, Canada
- Coordinates: 48.424359°N 123.3704865°W
- Opened: 1875

Height
- Architectural: Second Empire

Technical details
- Floor count: 3

Design and construction
- Architect: Thomas Seaton Scott
- Designations: Historic building

The Old Victoria Custom House, also known as the Malahat Building, in Victoria was completed in 1875 and designated as a historic building in 1987. It is a three-storey, mansard-roofed, custom house overlooking Victoria's harbour, symbolizing the era when Victoria was the pre-eminent commercial centre on Canada's West Coast. The Historic Sites and Monuments Board of Canada describes the building as a "relatively plain example of the imposing Second Empire style" adopted for such structures under Thomas Seaton Scott, the first Chief Architect of the Department of Public Works (1872-1881). Its modest design and materials reflect Victoria's size at that time."

== See also ==
- List of historic places in Victoria, British Columbia
