= Victoria Star 2 =

History

United States
- Name: Victoria Star 2
- Namesake: Victoria, British Columbia
- Owner: San Juan Cruises
- Operator: San Juan Cruises
- Port of registry: Bellingham, Washington
- Route: Bellingham-Victoria, Bellingham - Friday Harbor
- In service: purchased by SJC in 1995
- Identification: MMSI number: 367091440
- Status: in active service
- Notes: The largest passenger-only vessel in Bellingham

General characteristics
- Type: passenger ferry, charter boat
- Length: 96 ft (29 m)
- Installed power: 3 x Detroit Diesel 12V-71 TI
- Propulsion: 3 propellers
- Capacity: 149 passengers
- Crew: 4

Victoria Star 2 is a 96-foot (29 m) passenger-only foot ferry owned and operated by San Juan Cruises. The ferry operated during the summer months between Bellingham, Washington, United States, and the Inner Harbour in Victoria, British Columbia, Canada, making one round trip daily. For the 2011 season, service to Victoria was cancelled and the ferry is operating to Friday Harbor and other destinations in the San Juan Islands.

The vessel started her life as a mud boat ferrying supplies and personnel in the Gulf of Mexico. Converted into a passenger ferry, she later served the islands off Los Angeles, California (including Catalina Island). In 1992 and 1995 she served as a spectator's vessel during the America's Cup races held off the coast of San Diego, California. She was purchased later in 1995 by her current owner and brought to her current homeport of Bellingham, Washington where she continues to serve as a ferry and tourist vessel.

Primary power is provided by three (3) Detroit Diesel 12V-71 TI (Turbo - Intercooled) engines each driving its own propeller. Auxiliary power is supplied by Detroit Diesel generators. Typically a crew consists of one captain, one mate (unlicensed), and two deckhands to operate the vessel during each trip.
