= Victoria Express =

History
- Owner: Victoria Rapid Transit; Black Ball Transport

General characteristics
- Installed power: Detroit Diesel Offroad/MTU Series 60 diesel engines

Victoria Express II
- Owner: Victoria Rapid Transit; Black Ball Transport

General characteristics
- Installed power: Detroit Diesel Offroad/MTU Series 60 diesel engines

Victoria Express, also known as Victoria Rapid Transit, was the name of a private, seasonal ferry operation based in Port Angeles, Washington. The service operated two passenger-only ferries on routes between Port Angeles and Victoria, British Columbia and Friday Harbor, Washington during the summer, the 149-seat, 105-foot (32 m) Victoria Express and the 120-foot (37 m) Victoria Express II. Both ferries are gyroscopically stabilized.

In 2006, Victoria Express II, and in 2007 Victoria Express main engines were replaced. The new engines are Detroit Diesel Offroad/MTU Series 60 high efficiency engines. The Series 60 is a 4-stroke inline 6 cylinder diesel engine. The Victoria Express fleet operates on biodiesel.

With the amount of Victoria tourism in 2010, the service, which operated from May to September (May to October for the 2010 season), intended to expand its Port Angeles-Victoria service to operate year-round, but on 4 March 2011 it was announced that the service has been discontinued and was purchased by Black Ball Transport which operates MV Coho on the same route. The service has been renamed Expeditions Northwest and the vessels now operate on eco-tours through the San Juan Islands, Puget Sound, Strait of Juan de Fuca and Victoria, but continue to remain based in Port Angeles. The first trip for the new service debuted on 16 April 2011.

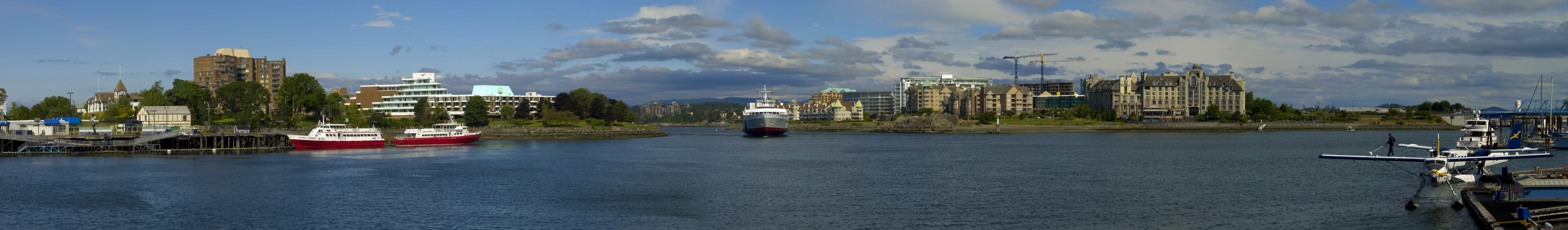
Victoria Express and Victoria Express II (the red and white vessels on the far left) docked in Victoria Harbour.
