= Rock Bay, Victoria =

Neighbourhood of Victoria, British Columbia

Coordinates: 50°20′N 125°29′W

Rock Bay is a neighbourhood bordering downtown Victoria, British Columbia, Canada, whose borders are the Upper Harbour on the west, Bay Street on the north, Dowler Street on the east, and Chatham Street on the south. Rock Bay derives its name from the local bay of the same name.

== History ==
Located southeast of the Bay Street Bridge, Rock Bay was encroached upon by the growth of the downtown core in the mid-1800s. Historically, the bay was larger, with many islets for which it was named. The islets were engulfed within an encompassing shoreline, extending far enough eastward to present-day Government Street. Currently located in the corner of the Inner Harbour, it is surrounded by industrial activities; with polluted water.

Around 1885, the urban areas of Victoria continued to expand, and a bridge crossed the eastern section of Rock Bay, linking Government Street to the northern extension. During the mid-to-late 19th century, Fernwood contained a swampy marshland, and Hillside Farms existed between Bay Street and Hillside Avenue. Until c. 1888, a creek visibly connected all these areas to discharge into Rock Bay of Victoria Upper Harbour.

An unnamed creek once ran southwest from the swampy marshlands in Fernwood, under a bridge on Cedar Hill Road and past Hillside Farm. The creek meandered in the area of Kings Road to eventually provide a source of fresh water for Rock Bay. Around 1888, the creek was enclosed in pipes to provide direct drainage to the area and prevent floods in the expanding paved streets of Victoria.

In 1887, a second wooden bridge known as Rock Bay Bridge connected the north and south shores of Rock Bay. The Rock Bay Bridge originally connected Bridge Street and Constance Street. Around 1903, the approach to Rock Bay Bridge was switched along the southern shore to Store Street. During the 1920s, the Rock Bay bridge was dismantled while the eastern indent of Rock Bay was simultaneously filled to the west side of Government Street. Progressive shoreline changes continued until the late 1950s, resulting in the smaller Rock Bay area.

Historical activities along the shores of Rock Bay included a tannery, sawmills, a coal gasification plant, a propane tank farm, and more recently, a concrete batch plant and an asphalt plant.

== Community ==
The neighbourhood is a mix of commercial, retail, industrial parks, and some residential. The neighbourhood includes a Dairy Queen, gas stations, car lots, the Vancouver Island Brewery, Club Phoenix fitness centre, a book publisher, and a massage school. It is in the ivy-covered former BC Hydro building on Bay and Government.

== Present-day ==
Rock Bay, which is purported to be one of the most highly contaminated bodies of water in the province, is (as of 2006) undergoing extensive cleanup by the federal government. Decades of runoff and pollution dumping from nearby gravel operations and former mills have led to current pollution levels. With the recent trend in urban living movements (more people moving into the downtown core), as is the case in many cities, Rock Bay is one of the few areas remaining in Victoria that lends itself to high development potential. Rock Bay is also the present site of Rock Bay Landing, a homeless shelter with transitional housing apartments which first opened in 2010.
