= Victoria West, Greater Victoria =

Coordinates: 48.4335°N 123.387°W

Victoria West
- Neighbourhood
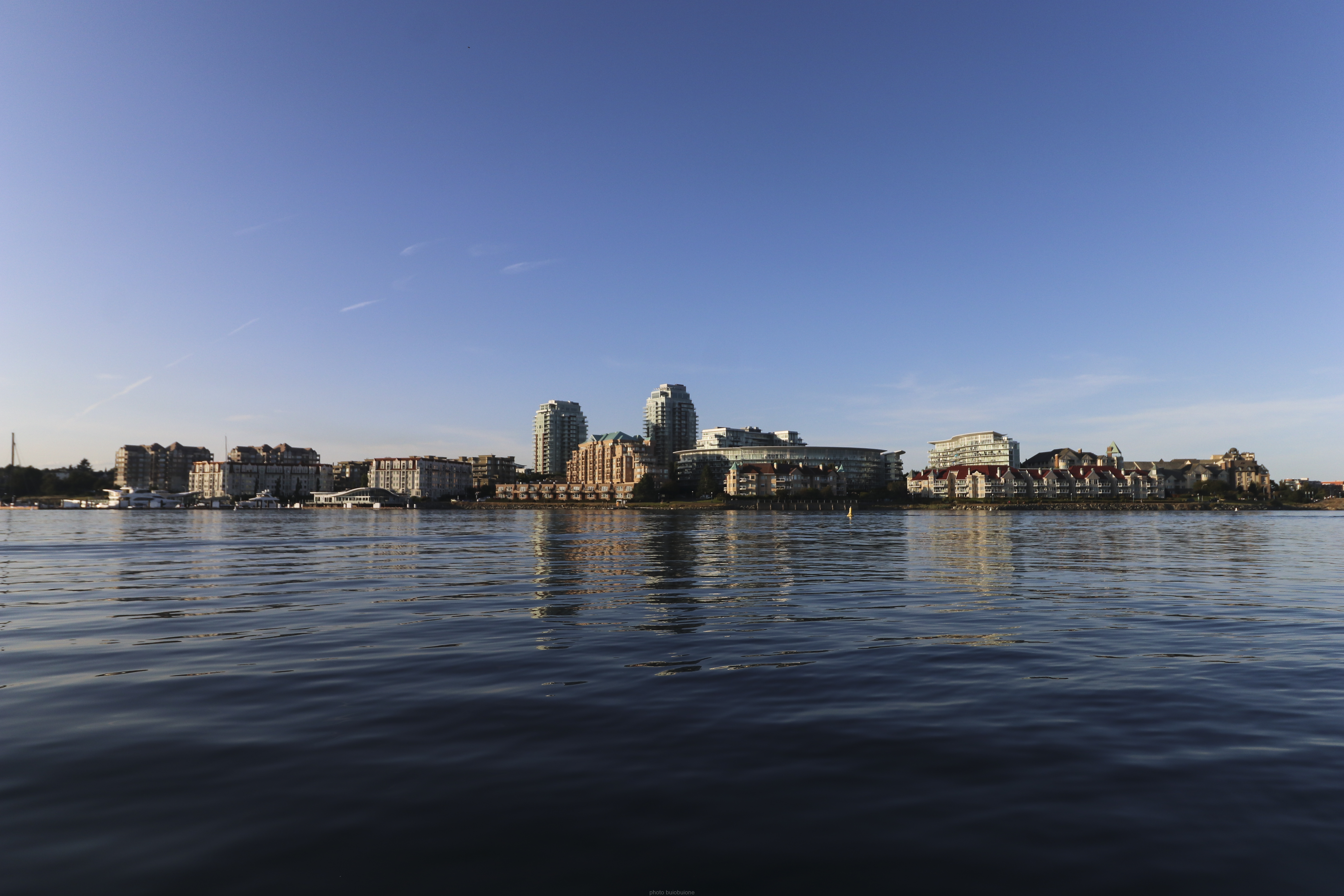
- South-eastern coastline of Vic West as seen from the Inner Harbour
- Nickname: Vic West
- Interactive map of Victoria West
- Country: Canada
- Province: British Columbia
- Regional district: Capital Regional District
- City: Victoria

Government
  - MP: Will Greaves
  - MLA: Darlene Rotchford
  - Mayor: Marianne Alto

Area
  - Total: 158 ha (390 acres)

Population (2011)
  - Total: 6,805
- Website: www.victoriawest.ca

Victoria West, commonly called Vic West, is a historic neighbourhood of the city of Victoria, British Columbia, Canada, located just west of downtown across Victoria Harbour, bordering on the Township of Esquimalt.

When the Hudson's Bay Company arrived in Victoria in 1842 to establish Fort Victoria, the neighbourhood now known as Victoria West was the site of a village of the Songhees, the aboriginal people of the Victoria area. The Songhees called the Gorge waterway Camossung, named for a girl who turned to stone at the Gorge tidal rapids. Songhees longhouses once extended from Songhees Point to beyond the present day Johnson Street Bridge.

In 1911, the Songhees people relocated to the New Songhees Reserve in Esquimalt to permit industrial development in Victoria West, following protracted negotiations with the band. Compensation included $10,000 per household (approximately $230,000 in 2021 Canadian dollars), which, in contrast to the usual practice, was paid directly to households rather than being held in trust by the Department of Indian Affairs.

Much of the residential and early commercial development of Victoria West occurred in the 1890s up until 1913. Residential development was facilitated by the arrival of streetcar service in 1890. While a few expensive homes were located in the neighbourhood, particularly in the area of the Gorge waterway, much of the development in the area was for working-class families. The Esquimalt and Nanaimo Railway line passes through Victoria West, and the roundhouse was located in the neighbourhood. In addition, at one time there were as many as seven shipbuilding companies in the area.

The largest and grandest of the homes built along the Vic West shore of the Gorge was Burleith, the residence built in 1892 by James Dunsmuir, son of Robert Dunsmuir and set among 20 acres (8.1 ha) of lawns and gardens. While Burleith has been demolished, Roslyn, another smaller grand home remains on Catherine Street. Built in 1890 in the Queen Anne style for Andrew Gray, manager of the Albion Iron Works, Roslyn made an appearance in the movies when actor Bruce Dern leapt from an upstairs balcony.

In 1924 the Johnson Street Bridge bascule bridge was constructed linking Downtown Victoria with Vic West. A second bridge, the Bay Street Bridge, stands where the Point Ellice Bridge was located. On May 26, 1896 an overloaded streetcar of holidaymakers celebrating Queen Victoria's Diamond Jubilee caused the Point Ellice Bridge to collapse, killing 55 people. The Point Ellice Bridge Disaster is the worst transit accident in Canadian history.

As industry left the area in the latter part of the 20th century, an opportunity for redevelopment of the former Songhees lands presented itself, and from the late 1980s condominium development along the harbour facing Downtown Victoria has resulted in an influx of population and spurred redevelopment of other parts of Victoria West, a process that continues with developments such as Dockside Green, the Railyards project and Bayview Place.

Amenities in the area include the Victoria West Community Centre, churches and other services.

In 1984 Spinnaker's brewpub opened on Kimta Road off Esquimalt Road. The Westsong Way, a pedestrian walkway, winds along the shore around Songhees Point, offering views of Downtown Victoria and James Bay across the harbour. Parks and open space also include Victoria West Park, Banfield Park, Barnard Park, and Raynor Park.

The area is served by Victoria West (Vic West) Elementary School.
