= Downtown Victoria =

Coordinates: 48°25′35″N 123°21′54″W

- Downtown Area
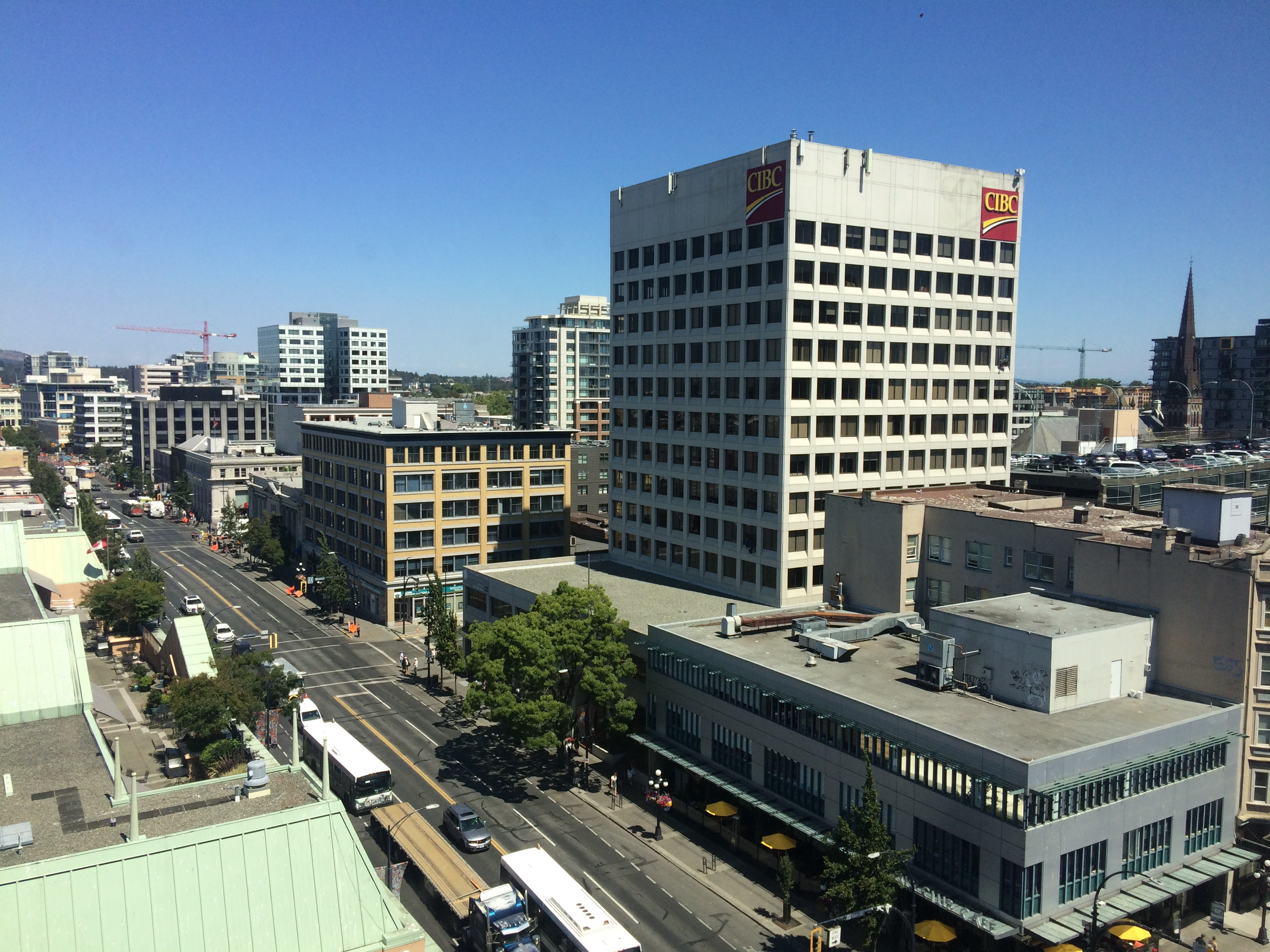
- Downtown Victoria looking up Douglas Street
- Interactive map of Downtown Victoria
- Country: Canada
- Province: British Columbia
- Municipality: Victoria
- Community: Victoria

Area
  - Total: 8.1 km^{2} (3.1 sq mi)

Population (2016)
  - Total: 40,681
  - Density: 5,000/km^{2} (13,000/sq mi)
- Canadian Postal code: V
- Area code: 250

Downtown Victoria is a neighbourhood of Victoria, British Columbia, Canada that serves as the city centre and the central business district for the City of Victoria, and the Greater Victoria regions.

== Characteristics ==
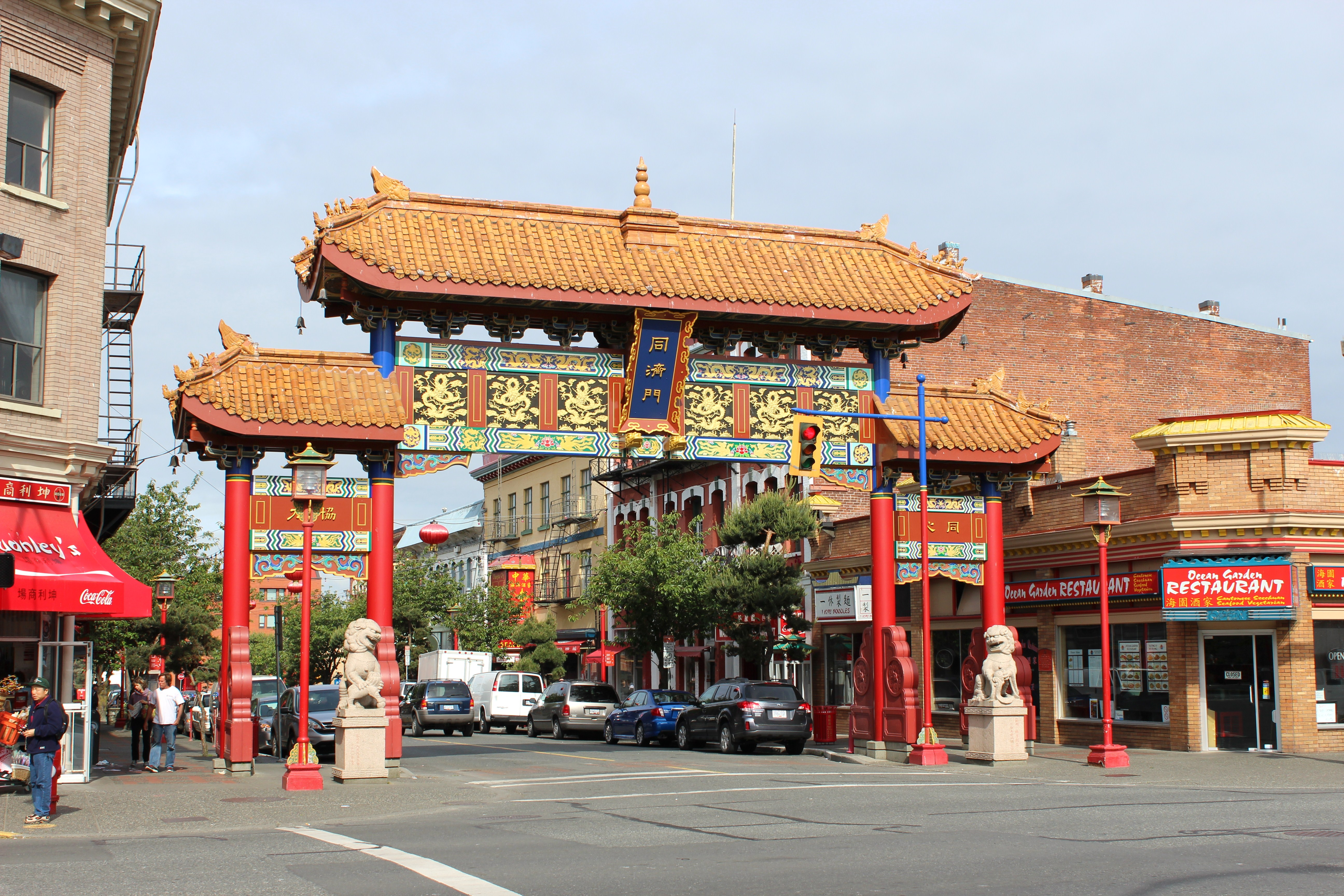
The Gate of Harmonious Interest in Chinatown, a neighbourhood situated in Downtown Victoria

The downtown area is an extremely popular place for tourists and local Victorians, as that is where many of the movie theatres, stage theatres, hotels, restaurants, pubs, nightclubs, and shops are. Many tourist attractions are located in and around the area including Bastion Square, heart of the 19th-century city's professional district. Centennial Square is next to Victoria City Hall; it is used for small venue events such as the Electronic Music Festival, which takes place during the same time period as the BC Day statutory holiday and Symphony Splash. Market Square, towards the northwest end of downtown, is used for small venue concerts and festivals, containing shopping establishments and eateries and is part of the city's "Old Town". Just beyond Market Square and Old Town which is the cultural and historic Chinatown which forms part of the northern end of downtown Victoria. It has a colourful Chinese historical past from the early days of Victoria.

Downtown Victoria contains most of Greater Victoria's and the Capital Regional District's urban high rise office towers.

The Bay Centre shopping mall is located in the middle of downtown. Save-On-Foods Memorial Centre, located on the site of the former Victoria Memorial Arena, is the largest sports-entertainment multiplex on Vancouver Island and the second largest in British Columbia outside of the Greater Vancouver area.

== Attractions ==
=== Places of Interest ===
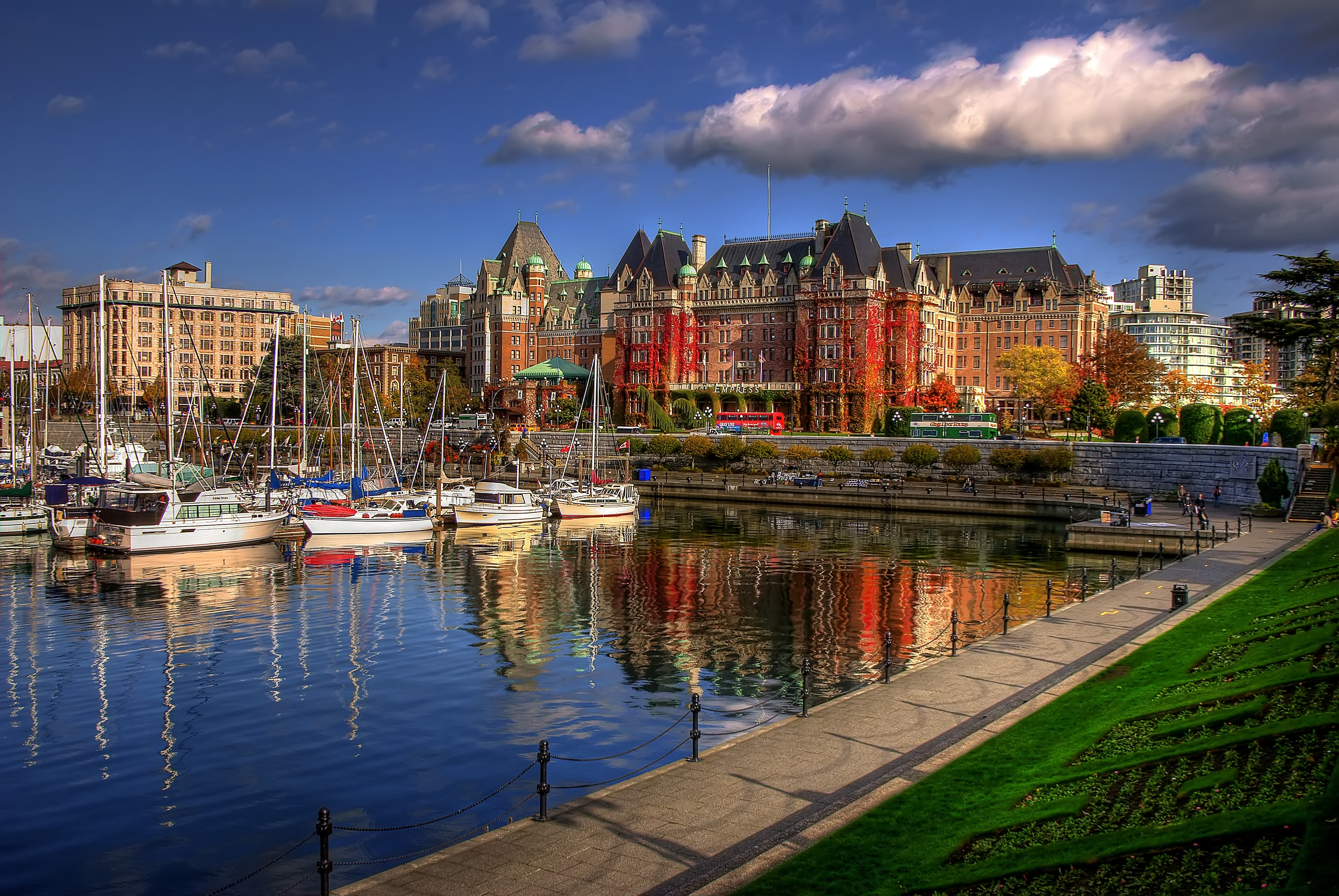
The Inner Harbour and The Empress Hotel (centre background), two major attractions in Downtown

- Bastion Square
- Beacon Hill Park
- Bug Zoo
- British Columbia Parliament Buildings
- Chinatown
- Christ Church Cathedral
- The Fairmont Empress Hotel
- Fan Tan Alley
- Government Street
- Johnson Street Bridge
- Market Square
- Miniature World
- Inner Harbour
- Save-On-Foods Memorial Centre
- Victoria Conference Centre

=== Events ===
- Victoria Film Festival
- Rifflandia Music Festival
- Victoria Ska Fest
- Symphony Splash

== Major skyscrapers and buildings ==
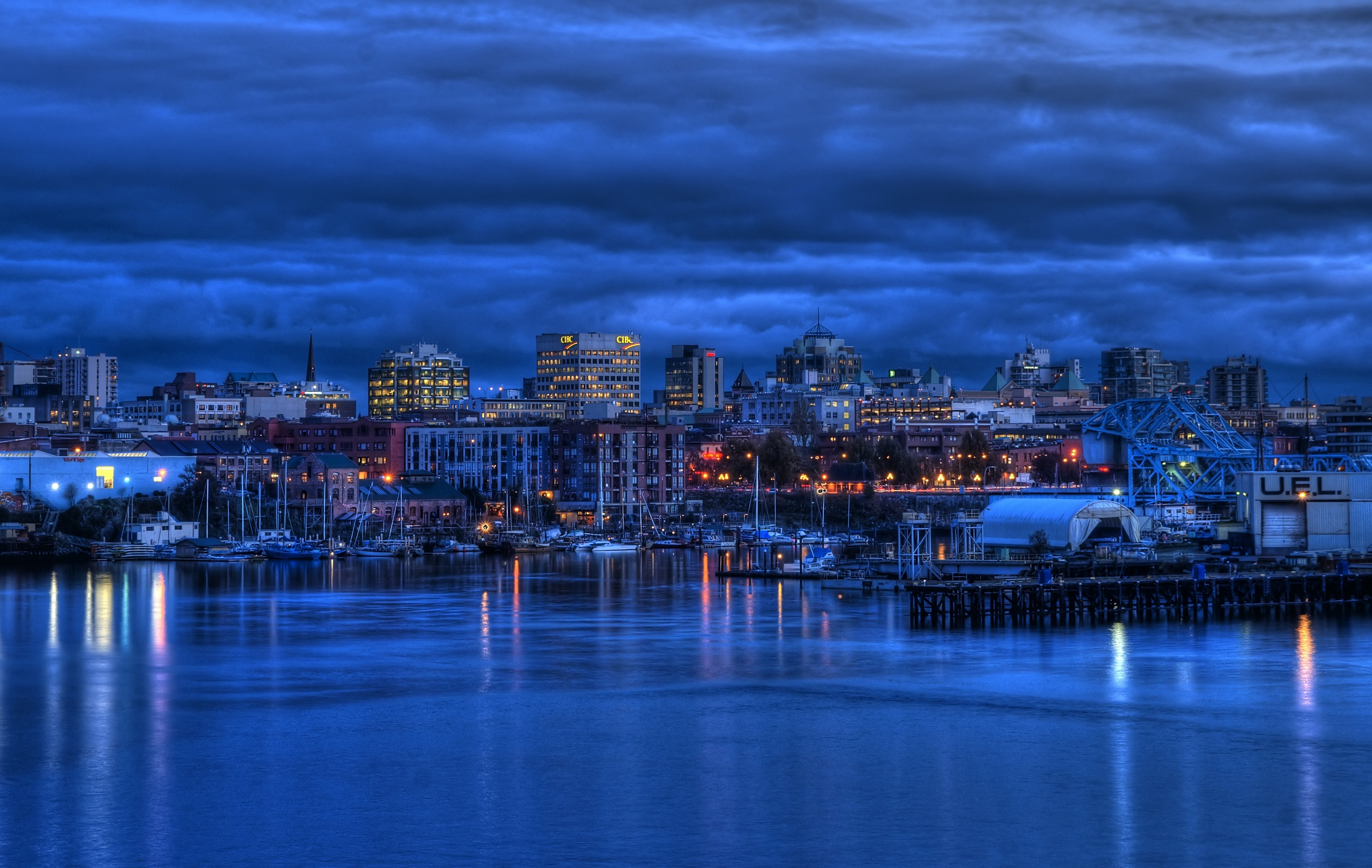
The skyline of Downtown Victoria at night

This list ranks notable highrises in downtown Victoria that stand at least 50 metres (164 ft) tall, based on CTBUH height measurement standards. This includes spires and architectural details but does not include antenna masts.

Rank	Building	Image	Height m (ft)	Floors	Year	Notes	Ref
1	Hudson Place One (Residential)		85.03 m (279.0 ft)	25	2020	Tallest building in Victoria and Vancouver Island as of 2020.	
2	Hudson House (Residential)		71.73 m (235.3 ft)	23	2022	Previously known as Hudson Place Two during development.	
3	Promontory (Residential)		66.45 m (218.0 ft)	21	2014	Tallest building in Victoria from 2014 to 2019.	
4	Orchard House (Residential)		61.9 m (203 ft)	22	1969	Tallest building in Victoria from 1969 to 2014.	
5	Astoria (Residential)	Street view of The Astoria.	61 m (200 ft)	20	2006		
6	Roberts House (Residential)	Street view of Roberts House.	59 m (194 ft)	21	1973		
7	Sussex Place (Office)	Street view of Sussex Place office tower.	58.4 m (192 ft)	11	1995		
8	DoubleTree by Hilton (Hotel)	Street view of the hotel DoubleTree by Hilton.	58 m (190 ft)	19	1965	Tallest building in Victoria. from 1965 to 1969. Formerly called the Executive House Hotel.	
9	View Towers (Residential)	View Towers apartment complex.	57 m (187 ft)	19	1968		
10	North Park Manor (Residential)	North Park Manor apartment complex.	57 m (187 ft)	16	1975		
11=	Encore (Residential)	Encore at Bayview Place condominium.	56 m (184 ft)	17	2018		
11=	Fannin Building (Museum)	Royal British Columbia Museum Fannin Building.	56 m (184 ft)	13	1967		
13=	989 Johnson		54 m (177 ft)	17	2019		
13=	The Falls (Residential)	Street view of The Falls condominium.	54 m (177 ft)	18	2009		
13=	The Manhattan (Residential)	The Manhattan condominium in Victoria, BC.	54 m (177 ft)	15	1995		
13=	Regents Park East (Residential)	Regents Park East tower condominium in Victoria, BC.	54 m (177 ft)	18	1991		
17	Legato (Residential)	The Legato condominium in Victoria, BC.	52.2 m (171 ft)	17	2018		
18=	Bank of Commerce Tower (Office)	Street view of the Bank of Commerce Tower.	50 m (160 ft)	12	1969		
18=	Chateau Victoria Hotel (Mixed use)	Chateau Victoria Hotel in Victoria, BC.	50 m (160 ft)	18	1990		

== See also ==
- Rogers Building (Victoria, British Columbia)
