= Bank of Montreal Building (Victoria, British Columbia) =

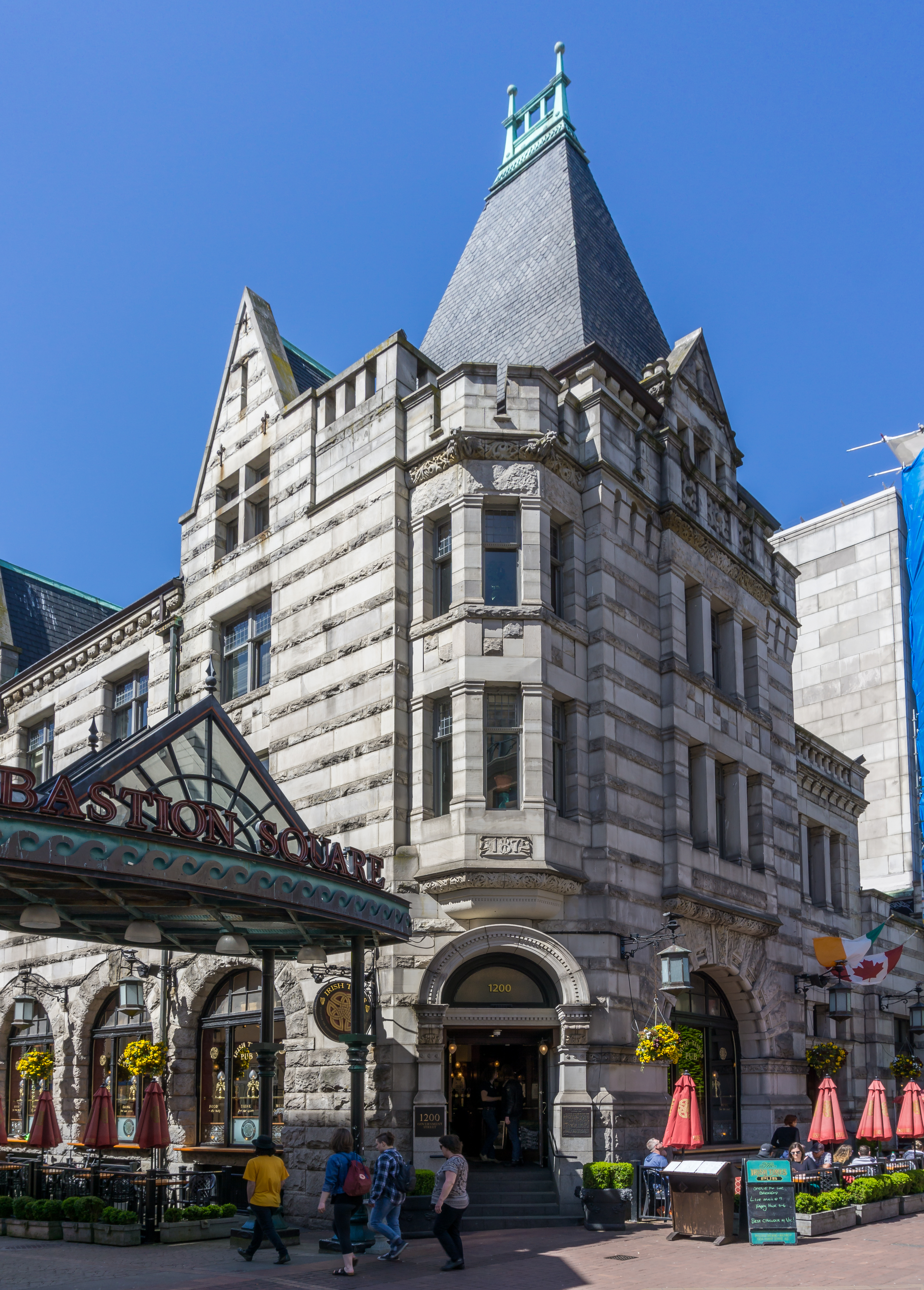
- The building's exterior in 2018
- Interactive map of the Bank of Montreal Building area

General information
- Type: Bank
- Location: Victoria, British Columbia, Canada
- Coordinates: 48.4258°N 123.3680°W
- Completed: 1897

Technical details
- Floor count: 4

The Bank of Montreal Building, or Bank of Montreal, Government Street Branch, is an historic building in Victoria, British Columbia, Canada. Designed by architect Francis Rattenbury, the building was constructed in 1897. It is located on Government Street, at the entrance of Bastion Square, a few blocks north of the British Columbia Parliament Buildings and The Empress. This building currently hosts the Irish Times Pub.

== See also ==
- List of historic places in Victoria, British Columbia
