= Belmont Building (Victoria, British Columbia) =

Coordinates: 48.4231°N 123.3679°W

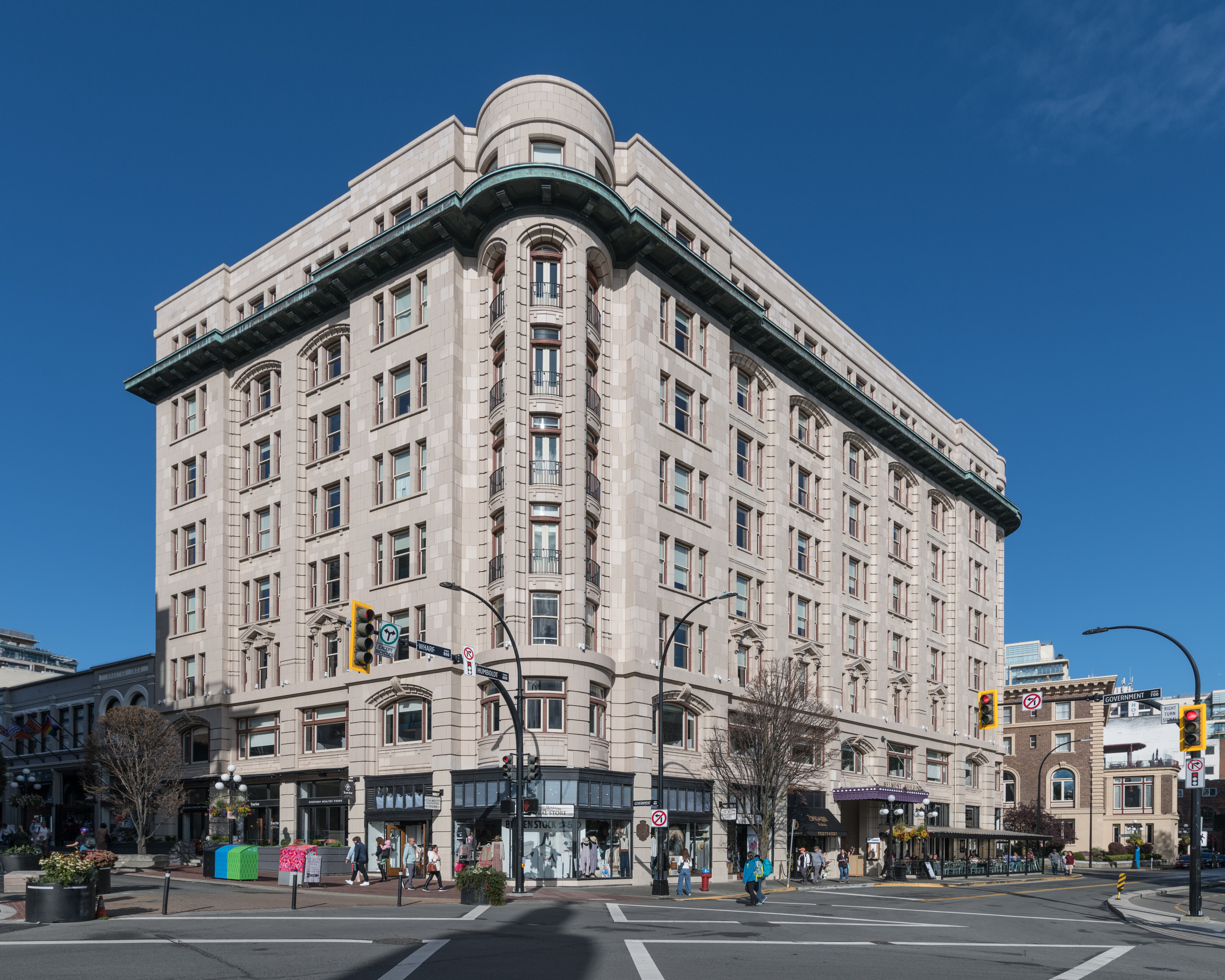
- The building's exterior in 2018
- Interactive map of the Belmont Building area

General information
- Location: Victoria, British Columbia, Canada

Height
- Height: 35 m (115 ft)

Technical details
- Floor count: 9

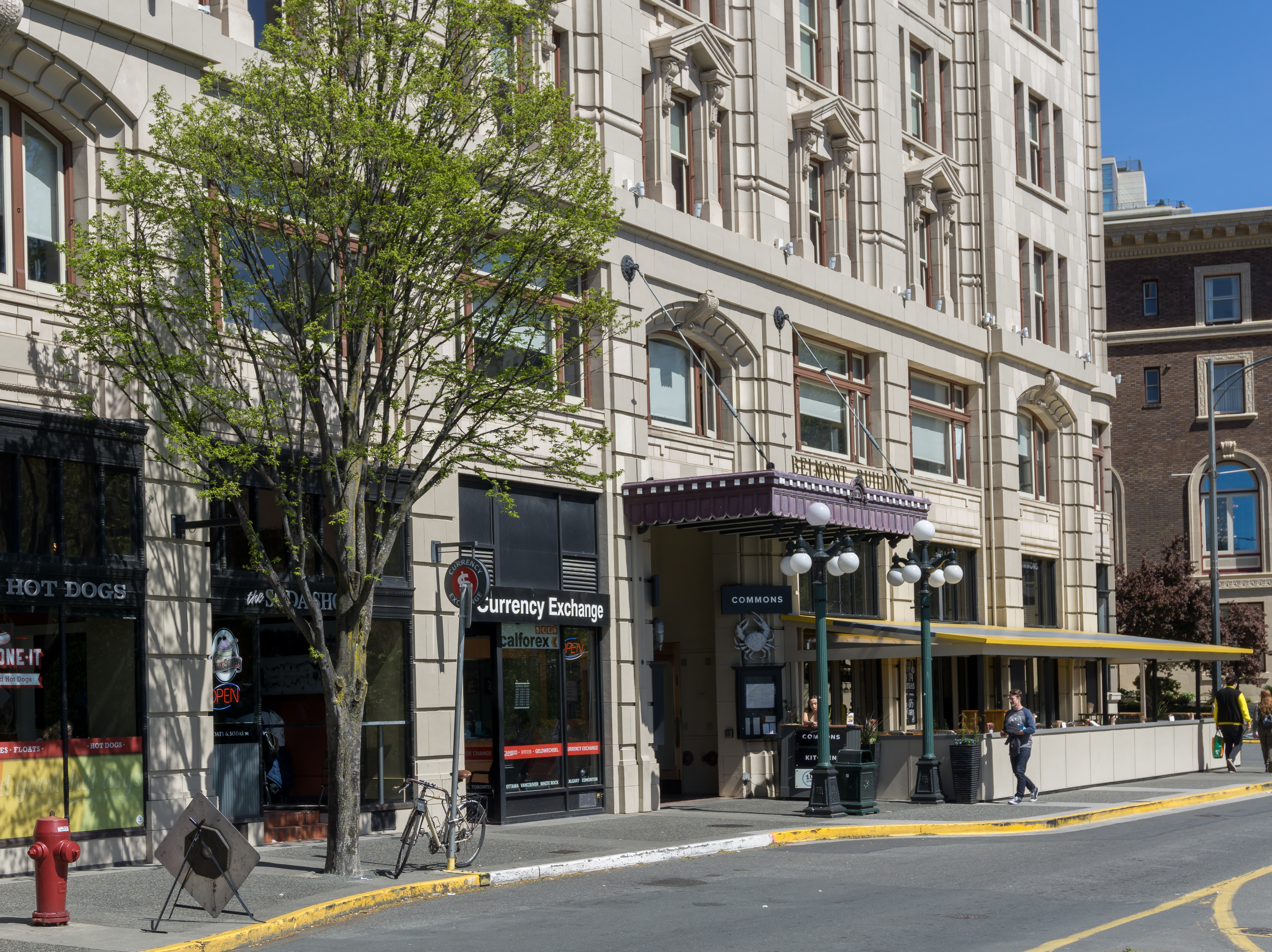
The building's entrance, 2018

The Belmont Building is an historic building in Victoria, British Columbia, Canada. It is located on Government and Humboldt Streets, just to the north of the Fairmont Empress Hotel.

== See also ==
- List of historic places in Victoria, British Columbia
