= Save-On-Foods Memorial Centre =

Multi-use indoor arena in Victoria, British Columbia

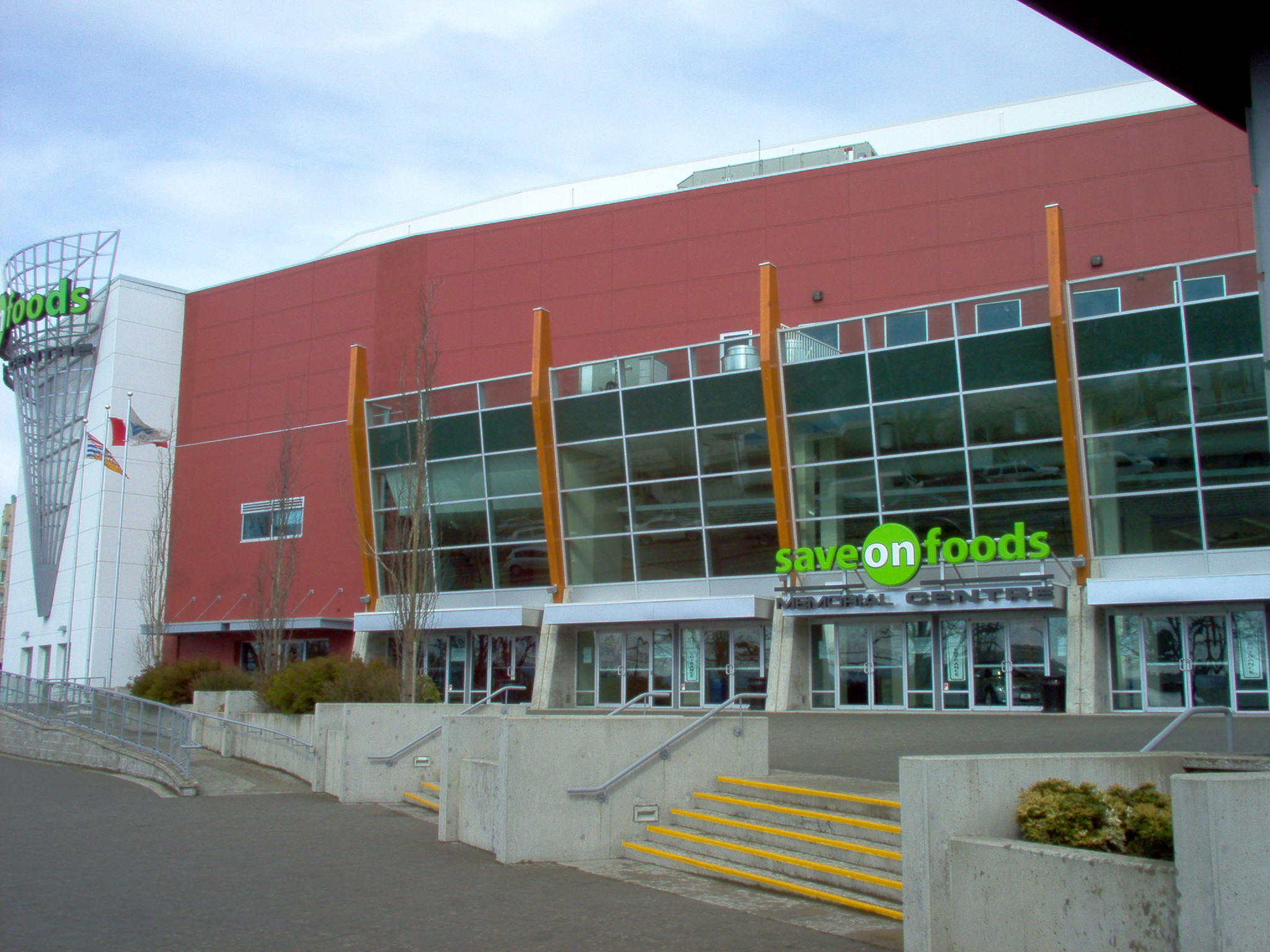
- The Front of the SOFMC

- Location within British Columbia Location within Canada
- Address: 1925 Blanshard Street; Victoria, British Columbia; V8T 4J2
- Coordinates: 48°25′53″N 123°21′38″W
- Operator: GSL Group
- Capacity: 7,006 (Hockey); 9,000 (Concerts)

Construction
- Groundbreaking: June 6, 2003
- Opened: March 26, 2005
- Cost: CA$40 million
- Architects: ICR Projects Inc. John Neilson Architects Inc.
- Structural engineer: Pomeroy Engineering Ltd.
- Services engineer: Keen Engineering
- General contractors: RG Construction, Ltd.

Tenants
- Victoria Royals (WHL) (2011–present); Victoria Salmon Kings (ECHL) (2005–2011); South Island Royals (BCMML)

Website
- sofmc.com

Save-On-Foods Memorial Centre (SOFMC) is an indoor arena located in Victoria, British Columbia, Canada, and is the largest arena in British Columbia outside of Vancouver. It is primarily used for ice hockey, previously the home arena of the Victoria Salmon Kings of the ECHL, and currently the home of the Victoria Royals of the Western Hockey League.

SOFMC was developed and is operated by RG Properties Ltd., a Vancouver-based development/entertainment company with commercial, recreational and entertainment facilities throughout British Columbia. RG Properties Ltd. was the corporate owner of the former Victoria Salmon Kings hockey team and owns the Victoria Royals.

== Features ==
The arena is primarily used for ice hockey and is also used for concerts and other special events such as figure skating, curling, plays, trade shows and conferences. It is also opened for public ice skating on special occasions; the public skated with the former Victoria Salmon Kings players after some of the games. The building also features a fine dining restaurant (Lion's Den Restaurant), 26 luxury suites, retail and meeting space. Shaw Communications has a television studio on the main floor and Regroove Solutions Inc] (formerly itgroove Professional Services) shares office space with the arena and Victoria Royals personnel. It occupies the site of the former Victoria Memorial Arena as its successor facility. It is located within 10–15 minutes walking distance from the other downtown Victoria landmarks such as Chinatown, the Bay Centre shopping centre and Market Square.

== History ==
SOFMC was completed in 2005 and has a maximum seating capacity of 7,400. It replaced the aging and outdated Memorial Arena, also known as the "Barn on Blanshard" (rectangular with a curved roof, resembled a barn or aircraft hangar) which had been constructed in 1949. The first event to be held at the new arena was a Rod Stewart concert, one in which Stewart and his performers came out on stage in hardhats and orange safety vests, poking fun at the fact the arena wasn't totally completed at the time.

== Select Your Tickets ==
Save-On-Foods Memorial Centre has its own in-house ticketing company called "Select Your Tickets", which is also owned by RG Properties Ltd. "Select Your Tickets" has been operating inside the building since it opened in 2005. And is also operated in Kelowna B.C.

| Preceded by Bear Mountain Arena | Home of the Victoria Salmon Kings; 2005–2011 | Succeeded by Last |
| Preceded by Prospera Centre (as the Chilliwack Bruins) | Home of the Victoria Royals; 2011–present | Succeeded by Present |
