= Chinatown, Victoria =

Oldest Chinatown in Canada located in Victoria, British Columbia

Coordinates: 48.429364°N 123.367909°W

Chinatown
- Neighbourhood
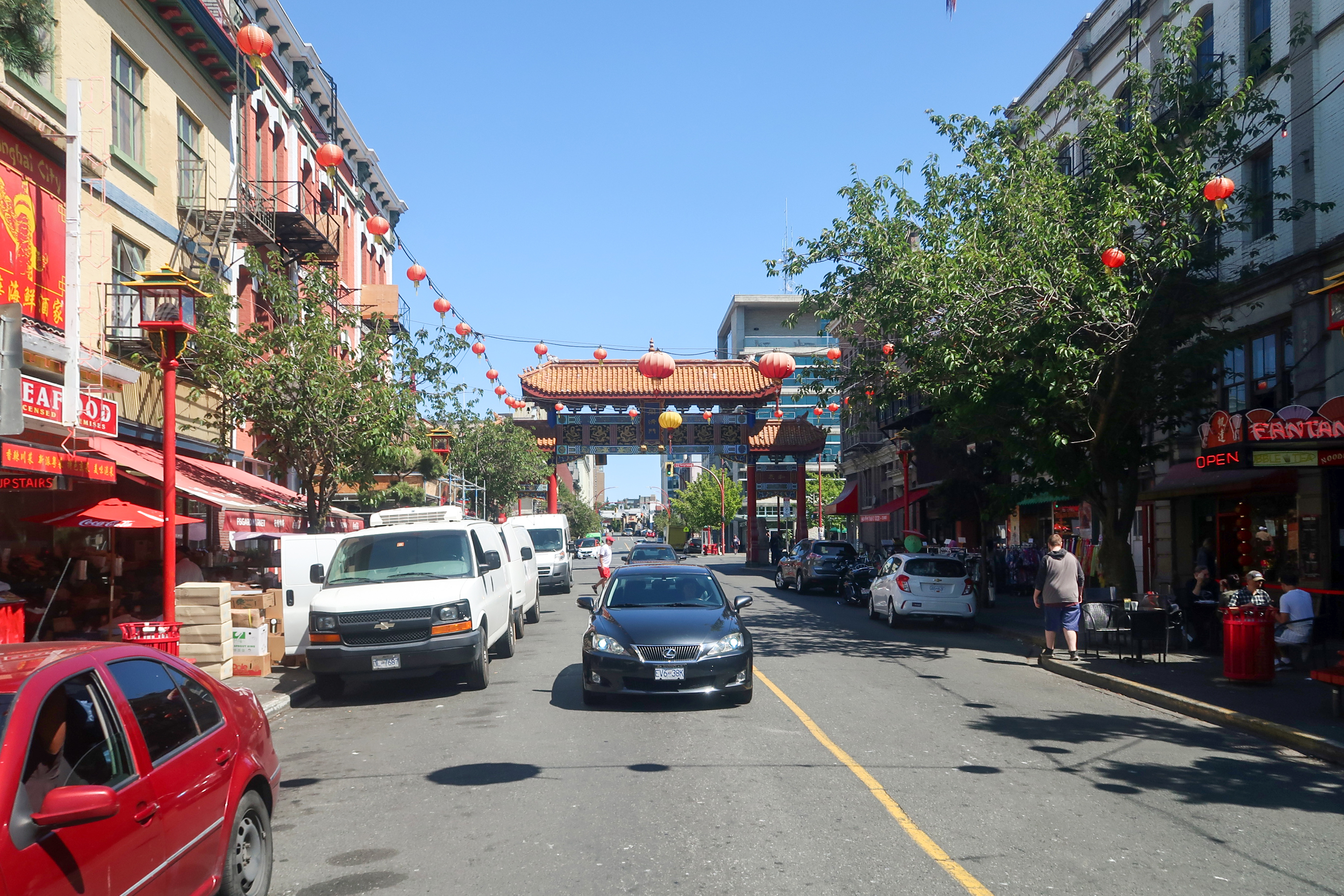
- Chinatown, with the Gate of Harmonious Interest in the background
- Interactive map of Chinatown
- Country: Canada
- Province: British Columbia
- City: Victoria

National Historic Site of Canada
- Official name: Victoria's Chinatown National Historic Site of Canada
- Designated: 1995

The Chinatown in Victoria, British Columbia is the oldest Chinatown in Canada and the second oldest in North America after San Francisco. Victoria's Chinatown had its beginnings in the mid-nineteenth century in the mass influx of miners from California to what is now British Columbia in 1858. It remains an actively inhabited place and continues to be popular with residents and visitors, many of whom are Chinese-Canadians. Victoria's Chinatown is now surrounded by cultural, entertainment venues as well as being a venue itself. Chinatown is now conveniently just minutes away from other sites of interests such as the Save-On-Foods Memorial Centre, Bay Centre, Empress Hotel, Market Square, and others.

The Royal British Columbia Museum states that it "was known for its maze of alleyways and courtyards, containing everything from movie theaters and restaurants to gambling dens."

== History ==
The discovery of gold in the Fraser Canyon in 1858 led to a sudden surge in immigration to British Columbia from California, about one third of which was Chinese. Within a year, immigration to the colony directly from China began as news spread of the gold find, but the gold rush was only one reason many Chinese citizens immigrated. Famine, drought or war in their homeland also encouraged the voyage across the Pacific Ocean to Victoria (on the Crown Colony of Vancouver Island en route to the Fraser Canyon, and later to Barkerville and the mainland's many other goldfields). The majority of the population was from South China, in Guangdong province. Later, the construction of the Canadian Pacific Railway would continue to bring Chinese workers.

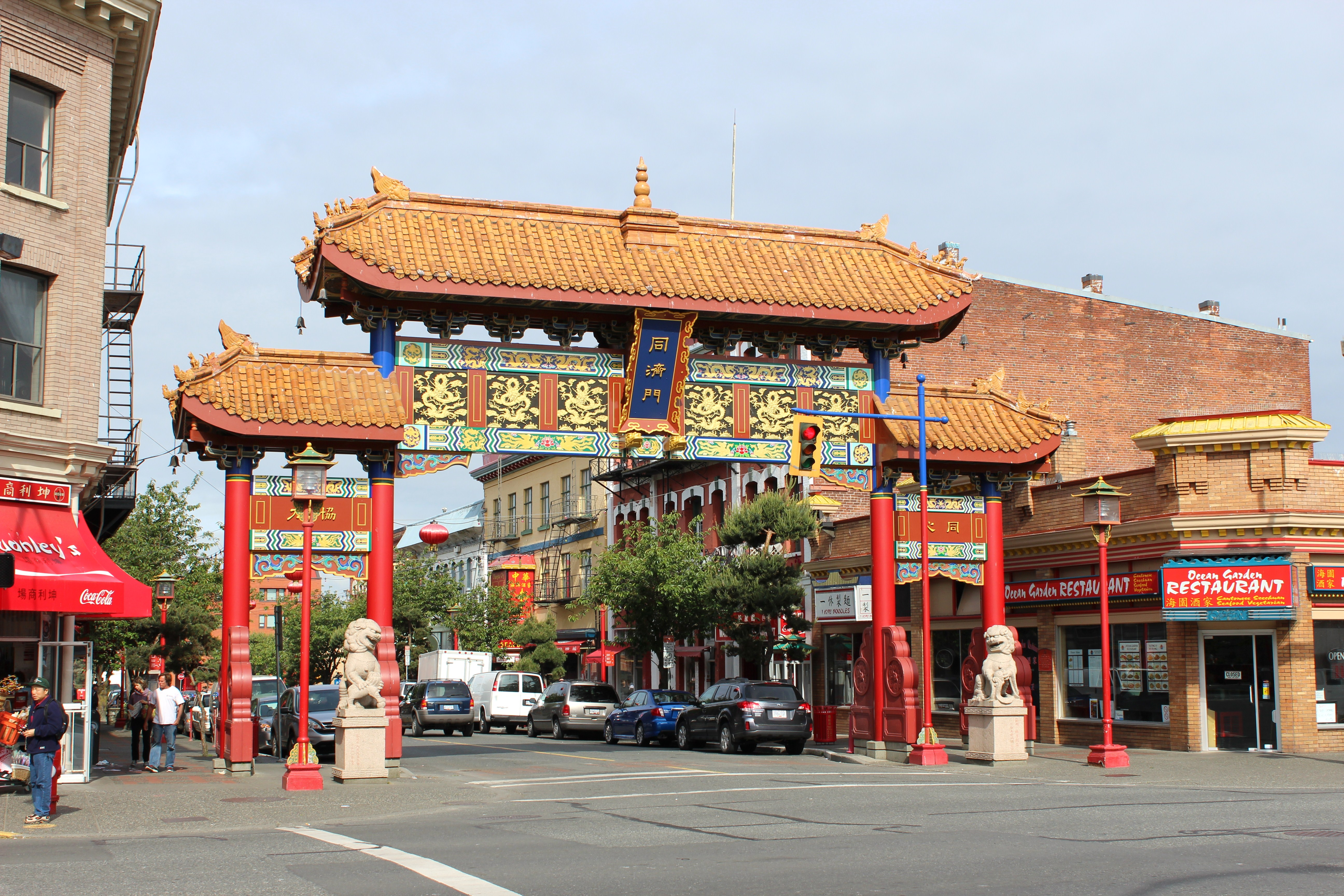
The Gate of Harmonious Interest was erected in the 1980s, as a part of a larger revitalization effort.

Initially a collection of crude wooden huts, Victoria's Chinatown rapidly evolved into a dense neighborhood of businesses, movie theaters, schools, churches, temples, and a hospital. It did gain a dark, seedy reputation however, because of opium factories, gambling dens, and brothels. Chinatown grew steadily over the years until its peak in 1911, when it occupied an area of about six city blocks in the north end of downtown Victoria. This area included two blocks of Herald Street, two blocks of Fisgard Street, and two blocks of old Cormorant Street. The block between Store Street and Government Street has since been renamed Pandora Avenue, and the block between Government Street and Douglas Street is now part of Centennial Square.

In 1911, Victoria's Chinatown housed 3,158 people, almost more than the entire population of downtown Victoria (including Chinatown and Harris Green) in 2001. From the late nineteenth century to the first decade of the twentieth century, it was the largest Chinese settlement in Canada.

Victoria's Chinatown suffered a period of decline between the 1920s and the 1970s, shrinking dramatically both in size and in population. In the 1980s, significant revitalization efforts were undertaken, most notably the construction of the Gate of Harmonious Interest on Fisgard Street (at Government Street). Ongoing revitalization over the years has included the introduction of coffee shops, cafes, studios, and workshops, as well as a small condominium development in Dragon Alley.

== Today's Chinatown ==
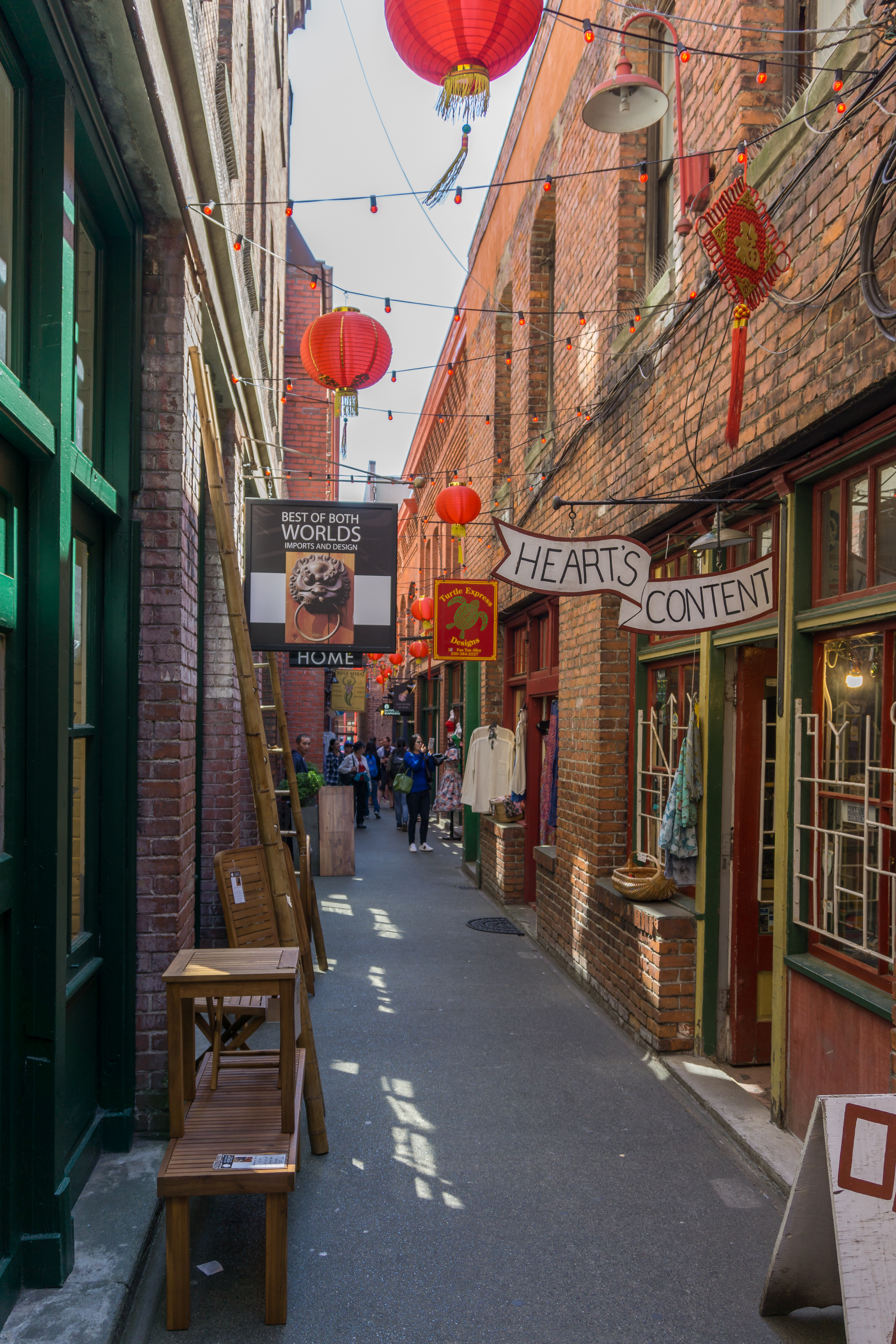
Chinatown is presently a popular area for tourists, consisting of several historical sites, including Fan Tan Alley.

Victoria's revitalized Chinatown is a popular area for tourists as well as for the artistic community. The focus is the 500–600 block of Fisgard Street, including famously narrow Fan Tan Alley, the old Chinese School and a small selection of historic buildings and Chinese businesses. Many historic buildings have been well preserved in Chinatown and also in the larger area it once occupied along Government Street, Herald Street, Store Street, and Pandora Avenue. The modern Chinatown continues to be a key component of Downtown Victoria with its many tourist attractions, hotels, bars, restaurants, movie theaters, services, and shopping areas. The district was designated a National Historic Site of Canada in 1995. It was considered as potential addition to Canada's tentative list of nominations to become a World Heritage Site, but has yet to be nominated.

Some of the tourist attractions of Chinatown are the previously mentioned Fan Tan Alley (originally a private walkway, now home to offices and retail shops), and its ornate gate, The Gate of Harmonious Interest. The stone lions that are part of the gate were built in Suzhou (Soochow), one of Victoria's sister cities.

Many of Chinatown's most historical and important places are out of public view, like the Tam Kung Chinese Temple, which is the oldest of its kind in Canada.

== See also ==
- Historical Chinatowns in Nanaimo
- Chinese Canadians in British Columbia
- History of Chinese immigration to Canada
- Chinese head tax in Canada
- Royal Commission on Chinese Immigration (1885)
- Chinese Immigration Act of 1885
- Chinese Immigration Act, 1923
- List of historic places in Victoria, British Columbia
