= Government Street =

Government Street may refer to:

== Canada ==
- Government Street (Victoria, British Columbia)

== United States ==
- Government Street (Mobile, Alabama)
