= Board of Trade Building =

Board of Trade Building can refer to:

== Canada ==
- Board of Trade Building (Victoria, British Columbia)
- Toronto Board of Trade Building, Toronto, Ontario

== United States ==
- Los Angeles Board of Trade Building, Los Angeles, California
- Chicago Board of Trade Building, Chicago, Illinois
- Haverhill Board of Trade Building, Haverhill, Massachusetts
- Board of Trade Building (Duluth, Minnesota), one of Duluth's tallest buildings
- Minnesota Block-Board of Trade Bldg., Superior, Wisconsin, listed on the National Register of Historic Places in Wisconsin
