= Hudson Place One (building) =

High-rise condominium building in Victoria, British Columbia

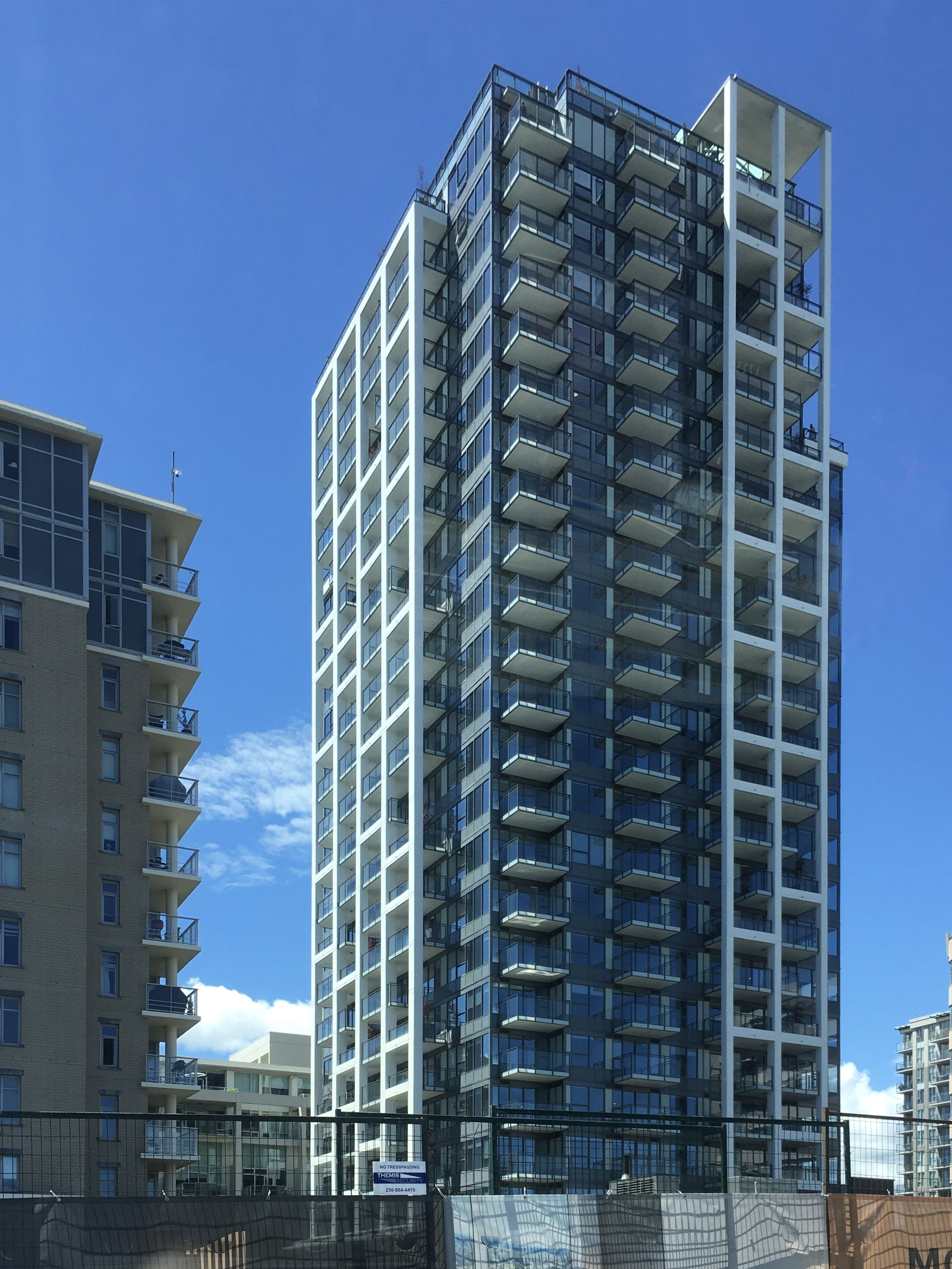
- Interactive map of the Hudson Place One area

General information
- Status: Completed
- Type: Residential
- Location: 777 Herald Street; Victoria, British Columbia; V8T 4K6
- Coordinates: 48.430046°N 123.3629°W
- Construction started: 2017
- Completed: 2020

Height
- Roof: 85.03 m (279 ft)

Technical details
- Floor count: 25

Design and construction
- Architect: Rafii Architects
- Developer: Townline

Other information
- Number of units: 176 units

Website
- hudsonplaceone.ca

Hudson Place One is a high-rise condominium building in Victoria, British Columbia. At 85.03 m (279 ft) tall, it currently stands as the tallest building in Victoria and on Vancouver Island. Hudson Place One is located at 777 Herald Street in Downtown Victoria.

== Background ==
The high-rise was initially proposed as a 29-storey building, but was scaled down to its current height after facing some opposition at city hall.

== Features ==
Hudson Place One has 176 condominiums, and features a decorative crest-shaped structure at the very top that illuminates and changes colours at set times.
