= Symphony Splash =

Annual event in British Columbia, Canada

Coordinates: 48.4247°N 123.3748°W

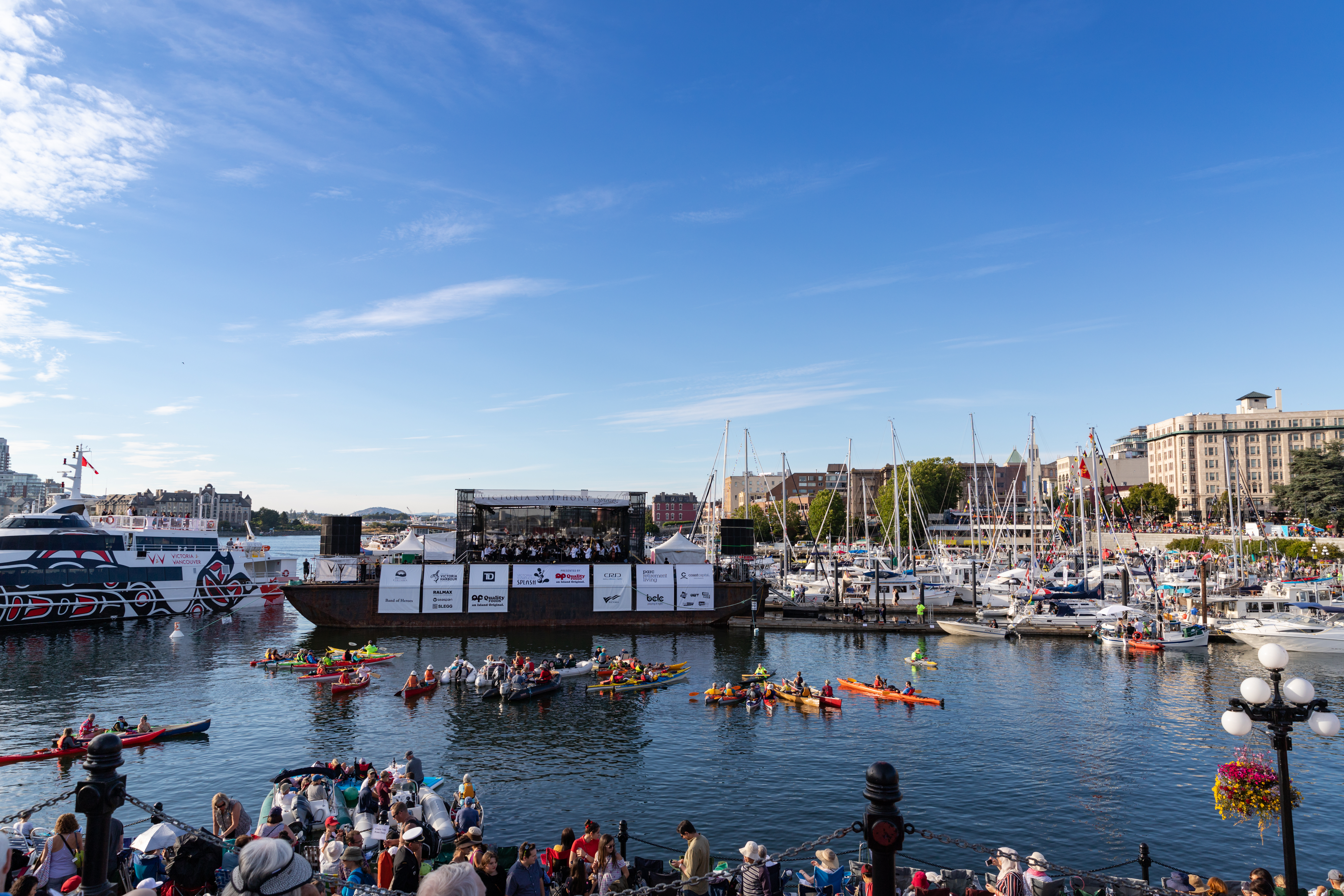
Victoria Symphony Splash

Victoria Symphony Splash is an annual event held in Victoria, British Columbia on the Sunday before British Columbia Day. The event is produced by the Victoria Symphony and consists of the Victoria Symphony playing, live on a barge, in the middle of Victoria's Inner Harbour. Also included in the event is a very large fireworks display, as well as live cannon fire, during the 1812 Overture.

The free event leads to about 40,000 spectators gathered around the Victoria waterfront, as well as on the grounds of the British Columbia Parliament Buildings and The Empress Hotel. It is one of the largest annual symphony events in North America. Hundreds of people gather in boats and kayaks to watch the concert. Each year, a young soloist is a featured performer with the orchestra.

The event in 2020 was cancelled due to the COVID-19 pandemic. The 2021 event was also cancelled. In 2022, the event was replaced with a ten-day "Splash Around Town" music festival. The full event is returning in 2025.
