= Gate of Harmonious Interest =

Gate in Chinatown, Victoria, British Columbia

- 同濟門
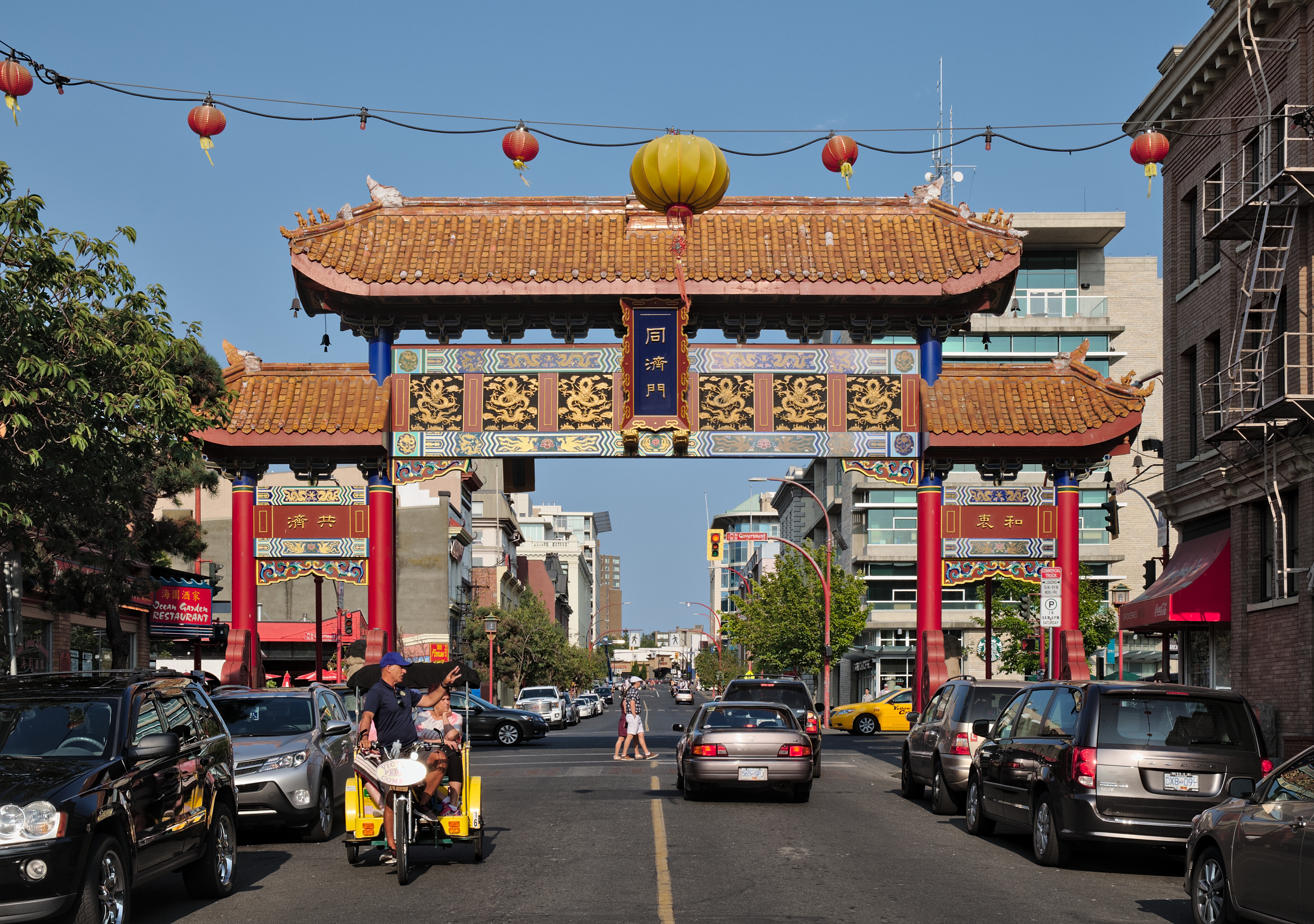
- The gate in 2018

- Location within British Columbia

General information
- Type: Gate
- Location: Chinatown, Fisgard Street, Victoria, Canada
- Coordinates: 48.429379°N 123.367334°W
- Opened: Nov. 15, 1981
- Cost: $130,000

Height
- Height: 11.6 m (38 ft)

Design and construction
- Architect: Mickey Lam

The Gate of Harmonious Interest (Chinese: 同濟門; pinyin: Tóngjì mén) is a gate and cultural landmark located in Chinatown, Victoria, British Columbia. It spans Fisgard Street, west of Government Street. Erected in 1981, it was part of the revitalization efforts of Chinatown by the City of Victoria and the Chinese Consolidated Benevolent Association. The gate is 11.6 metres (38 feet) tall, and is adorned with intricate red and gold decorations that represent themes of unity and harmony.

Two inscriptions on the gate, "To work together with one heart" and "To help each other achieve harmony," commemorate the collaborative effort between Chinese and non-Chinese communities in its construction and restoration. Flanking the gate are two hand-carved stone lions, donated by Victoria's sister city of Suzhou.

The Gate of Harmonious Interest houses two time capsules within its outer red pillars, scheduled to be opened in 2081 and 2096. Additionally, it features a plaque commemorating the 61 Chinese Canadians who died during World War II.

The idea for the gate originated from the City of Victoria's Ad Hoc Committee in August 1979, as a symbol of "the spirit of cooperation and participation between our Chinese citizens and the rest of the community." Designed by Mickey Lam, then the city's urban design planner, the construction of the gate cost $130,000, with contributions from the B.C. provincial government, Victoria's Chinese Canadian community, and other sources.

Between October 2025 and March 2026, the Gate of Harmonious Interest underwent renovations to its roof, as well as improvements to the lighting and sound system of the structure. On March 20, 2026, the refurbished gate was unveiled at a ceremony hosted by the Chinese Consolidated Benevolent Association and the Mayor of Victoria. The Wong Sheung Kung Fu Club performed a lion dance, accompanied by the sounds of traditional Chinese instruments.
