= Rogers Building (Victoria, British Columbia) =

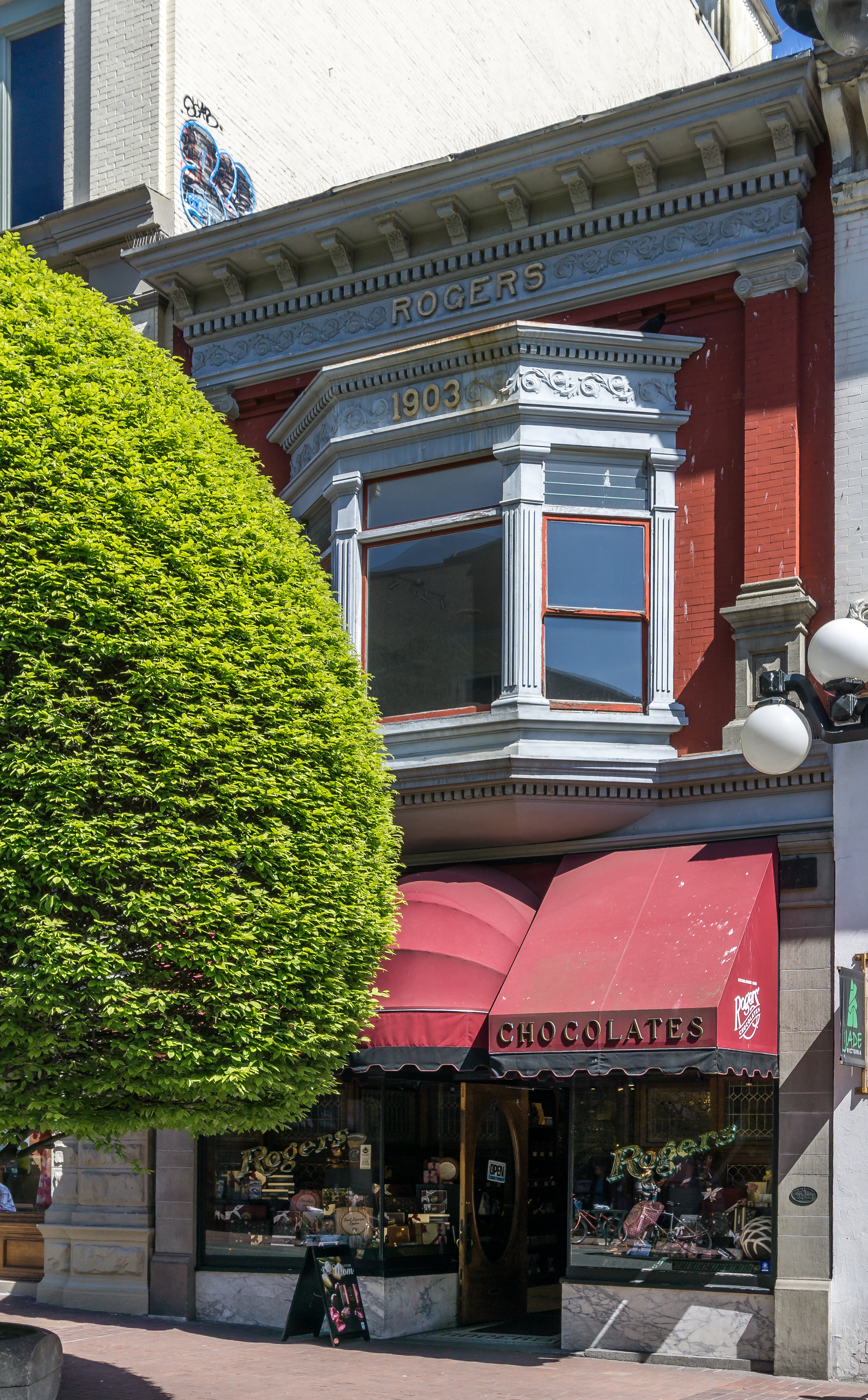
- Location: 913 Government Street; Victoria, British Columbia; V8W 1X5
- Coordinates: 48°25′26.05″N 123°22′4.41″W
- Built: 1903
- Original use: Grocery store
- Current use: Chocolate shop
- Architect: Charles Rogers
- Architectural style(s): Hooper and Watkins
- Website: www.rogerschocolates.com

National Historic Site of Canada
- Official name: Rogers Building National Historic Site of Canada
- Designated: 1991

Rogers Building or Rogers Chocolates is a historic building in Victoria, British Columbia, Canada, it is located at 913 Government Street in downtown Victoria.

The two-storey building was completed in 1903 by architects Hooper and Watkins for Charles Rogers (1854–1927), a grocer who operated from the opposite side of the street before 1903. Rogers Chocolates continues to operate from this site since.

The site was designated as a historic building in 1991. It is a small Victorian era commercial building with a Queen Anne Revival shopfront, and intact interior fixtures and decorative features.

== See also ==
- List of historic places in Victoria, British Columbia
