= Bastion Square =

Square in Victoria, British Columbia, Canada

Coordinates: 48.4258°N 123.3689°W

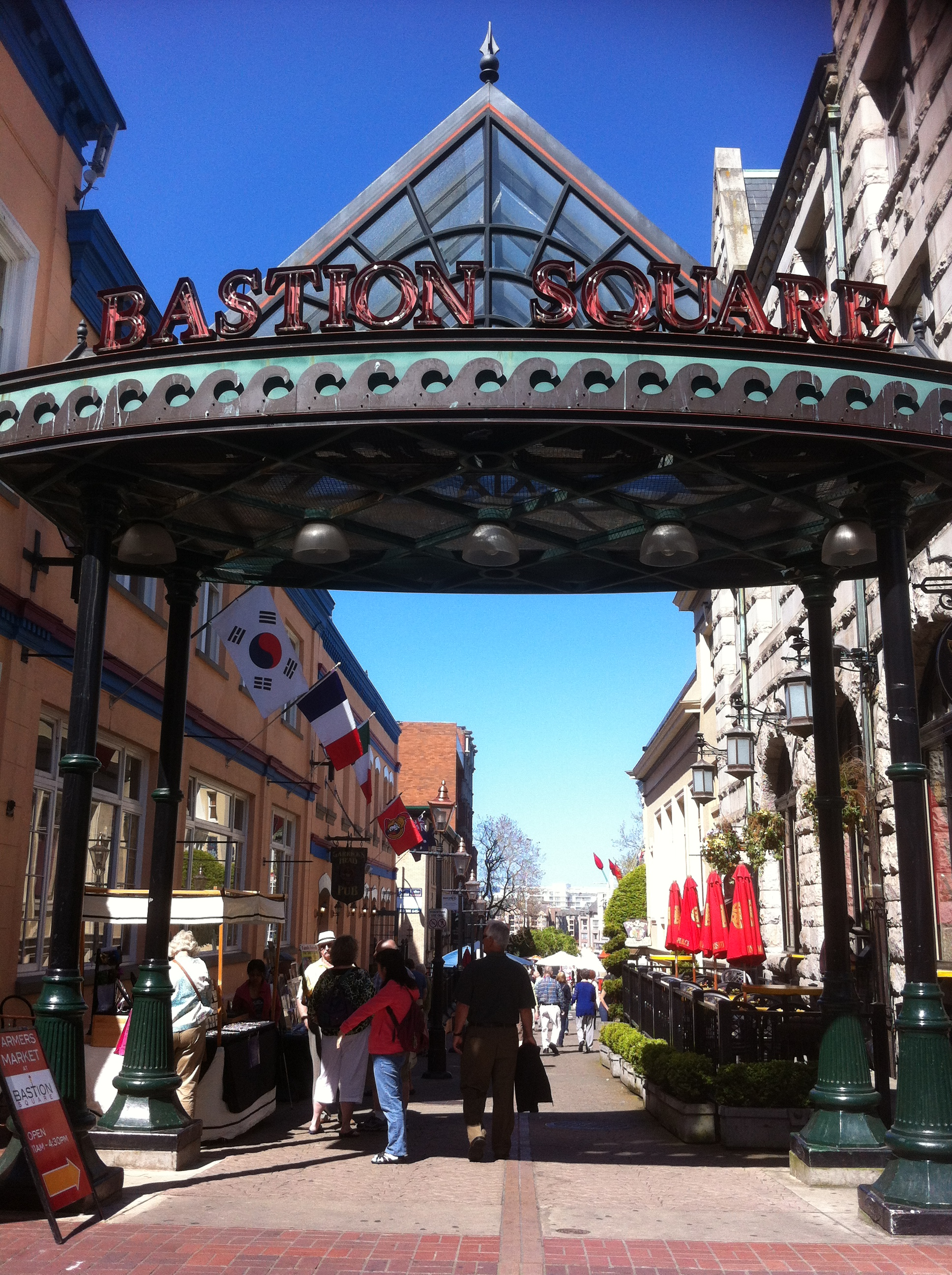
Entrance in 2012

Bastion Square is a historic pedestrian mall in Victoria, British Columbia.

The square has a ceremonial entry arch at View and Government streets, and the exit on the Wharf Street side opens to a staircase with a view of the Inner Harbour.

In 1963, under the direction of city planner Rod Clack, Bastion Square was developed as part of the modern scheme for Centennial Square. View Street was closed off, and a pedestrian area was created, set off by restored historic buildings on three sides and a view across the harbour on the fourth.

Historic buildings on the square include Burnes House, the Beaver Building, the Board of Trade Building, Chancery Chambers, Law Chambers, the Rithet Building, and the Supreme Court Building.

Events held at the square include the Bastion Square Public Market, the Holiday Market, and the Art Walk.
