= Bay Centre =

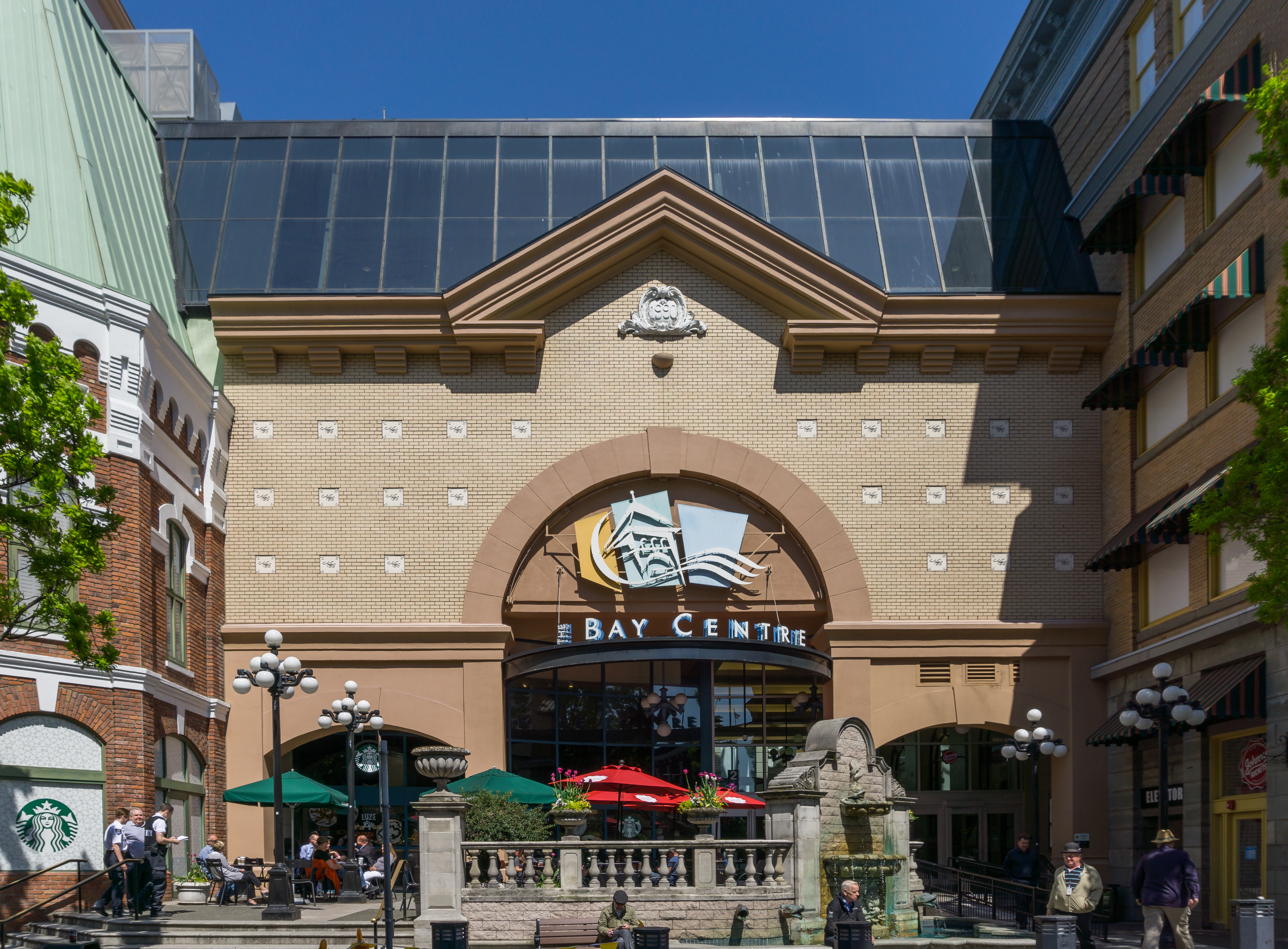
- Coordinates: 48.4251°N 123.3661°W
- Address: 1150 Douglas Street; Victoria, British Columbia, Canada; V8W 3M9
- Opened: 1989
- Developer: Cadillac Fairview and Eaton's
- Manager: JLL Properties
- Owner: LaSalle Investment Management
- Num. of stores: 93
- Num. of anchor tenants: 1
- Floor area: 39,115 m^{2} (421,030 sq ft)
- Floors: 4
- Website: www.thebaycentre.ca

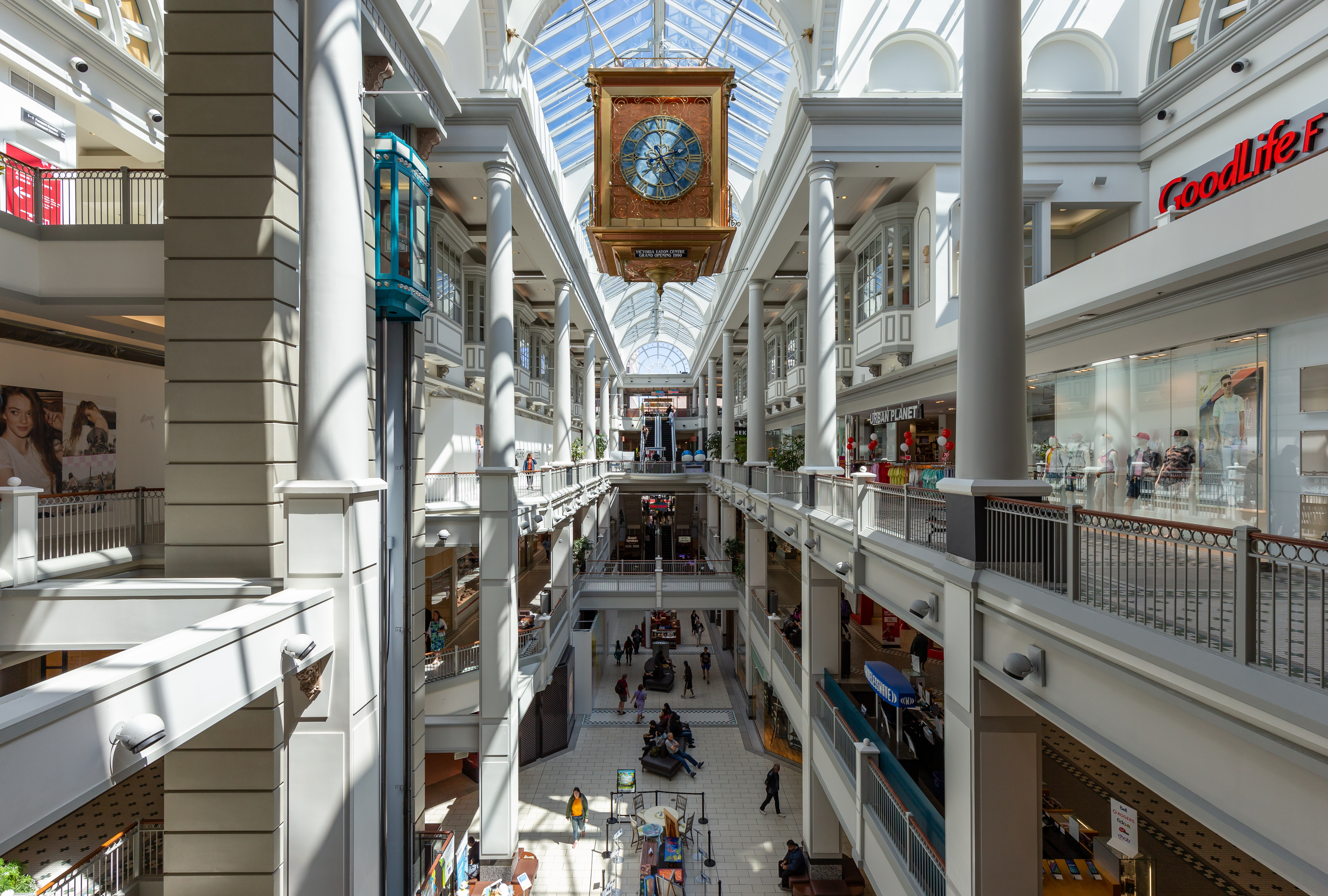
Atrium of the Bay Centre

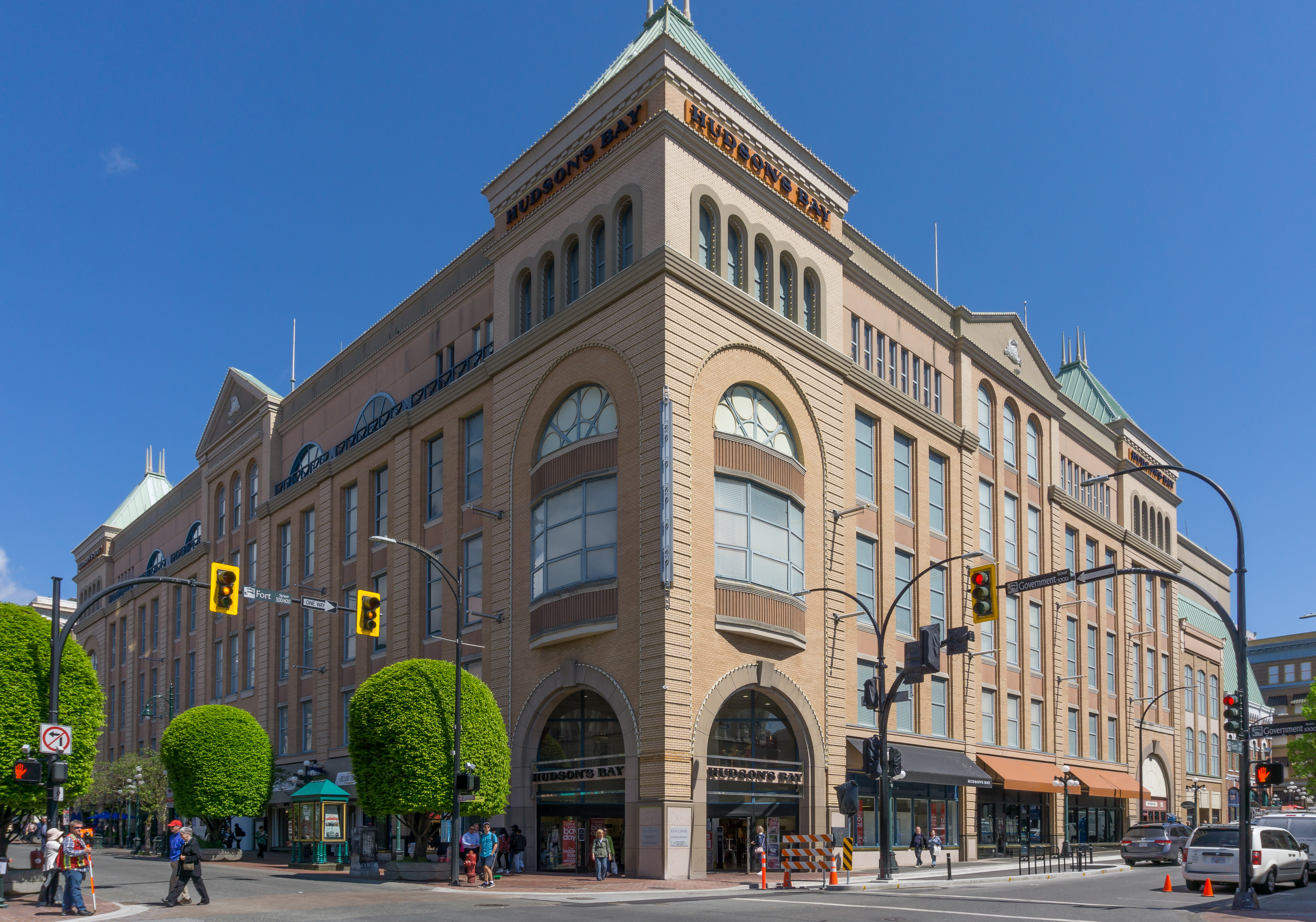
Exterior of the Bay Centre

Bay Centre (formerly the Victoria Eaton Centre) is a shopping mall in Victoria, British Columbia, Canada. It is bounded by Douglas, Government, Fort, and View streets, in the city's historic centre. It has 39,115 square metres (421,030 sq ft) of retail space.

Opening in 1989, the mall was the first large shopping mall in downtown Victoria. It occupies two city blocks of the Old Town area, including the site of the original downtown Eaton's store (previously Spencer's) at 1150 Douglas Street. Eaton's was demolished in 1987–88 to make way for the Eaton Centre project. The development of the shopping centre was initially the subject of controversy, as construction involved demolishing several historic buildings (or reducing them to facades in front of new construction) and closing one block of Broad Street.

The centre was initially a partnership between Eaton's and Cadillac Fairview. When Eaton's went bankrupt in 1999, the Eaton's store in this mall was occupied first by Sears Canada, and then by The Bay, for which the mall was renamed. In 2010, Cadillac Fairview sold the complex to LaSalle Investment Management for an undisclosed price in the range of CA$90 million to CA$110 million, which is among the largest real estate transactions in the city's history.

== Anchors and majors ==
- Passport Canada (995 m^{2} / 10,710 sq ft)
- Sport Chek (1,800 m^{2} / 19,375 sq ft)
- Winners

=== Former ===
- Hudson's Bay (19,301 m^{2} / 207,750 sq ft) (closed June 2025)

== See also ==
- Eaton Centre
- List of shopping malls in Canada
