= Board of Trade Building (Victoria, British Columbia) =

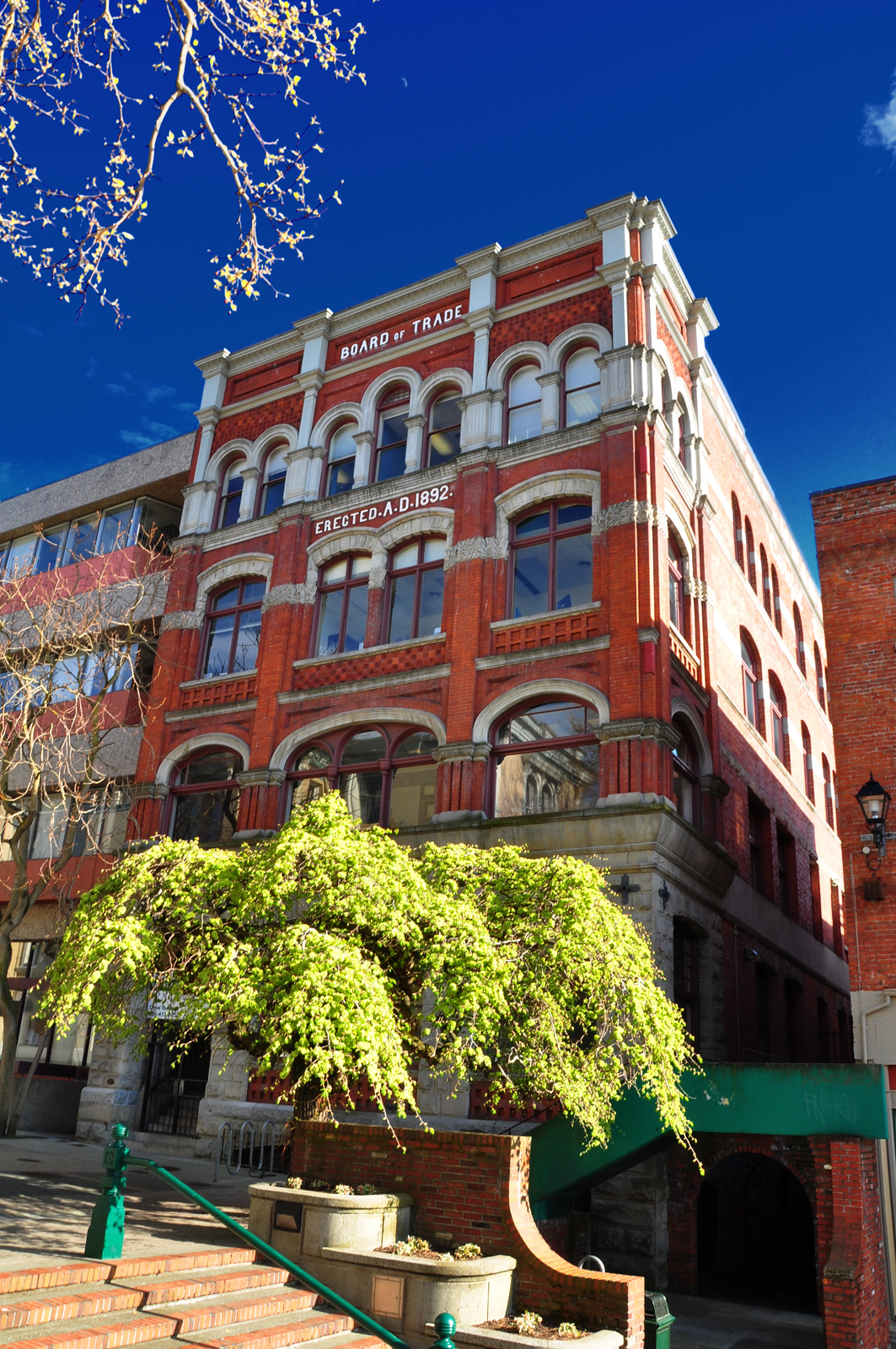
- The building's exterior in 2011
- Interactive map of the Board of Trade Building area

General information
- Location: 31 Bastion Square, Victoria, British Columbia, Canada
- Coordinates: 48.4257°N 123.3692°W

The Board of Trade Building is an historic building in Victoria, British Columbia, Canada. It is located on Bastion Square, east of Wharf Street. The building was home to Western Canada's first chamber of commerce, the Greater Victoria Chamber of Commerce founded in 1863.

== See also ==
- List of historic places in Victoria, British Columbia
