= Market Square, Victoria =

Market Square
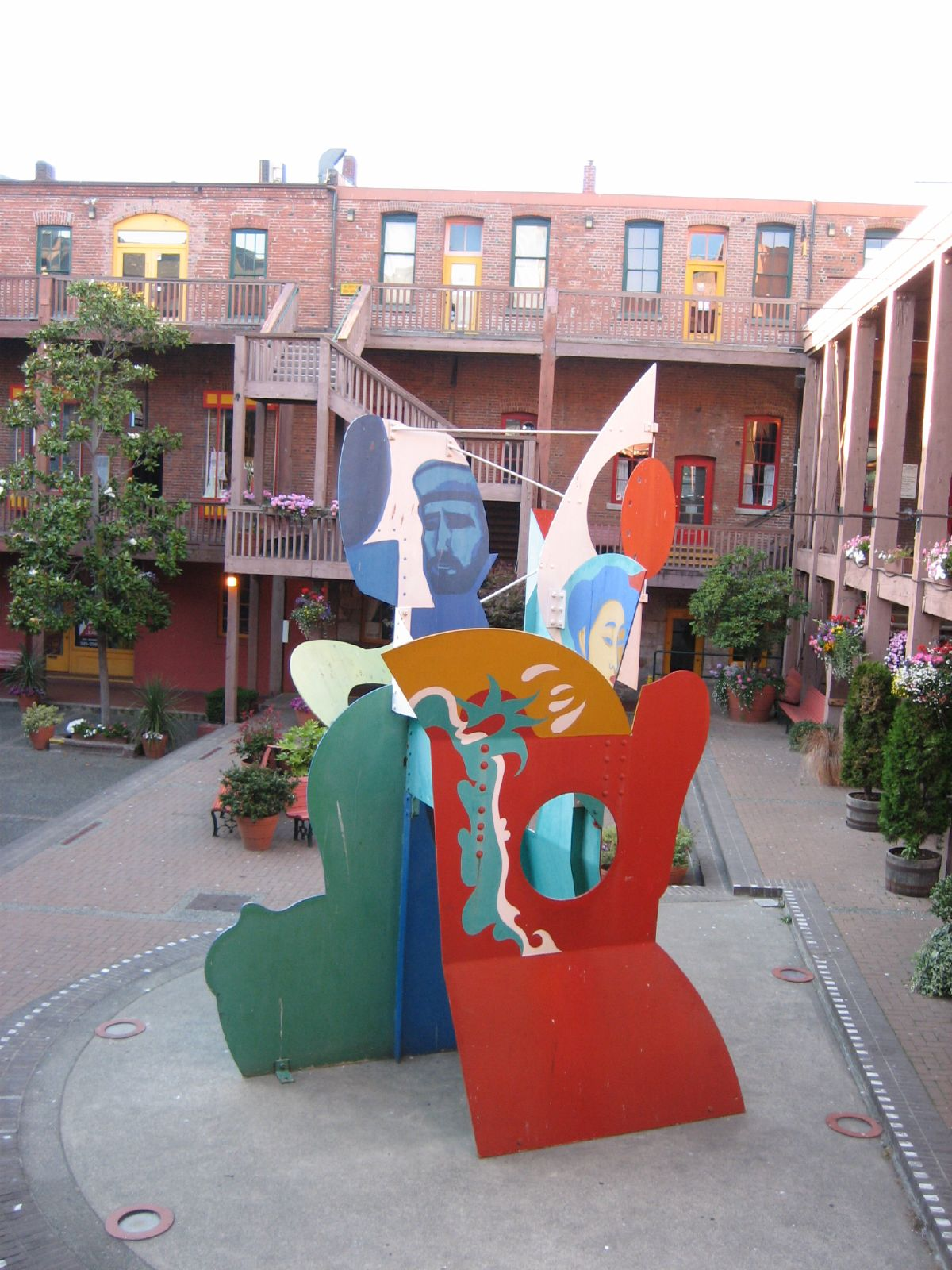
- Market Square sculpture
- Coordinates: 48°25′40.36″N 123°22′2.14″W
- Address: 560 Johnson Street; Victoria, British Columbia; V8W 3C6
- Opened: 19th century
- Owner: Anthem Properties
- Website: www.marketsquare.ca

Market Square is a town square and shopping centre located in the downtown core next to Chinatown in Victoria, British Columbia, Canada. There are more than 35 shops, restaurants, and clubs in the square.
