= The Empress (hotel) =

Historic hotel in Victoria, British Columbia, Canada

Fairmont Empress
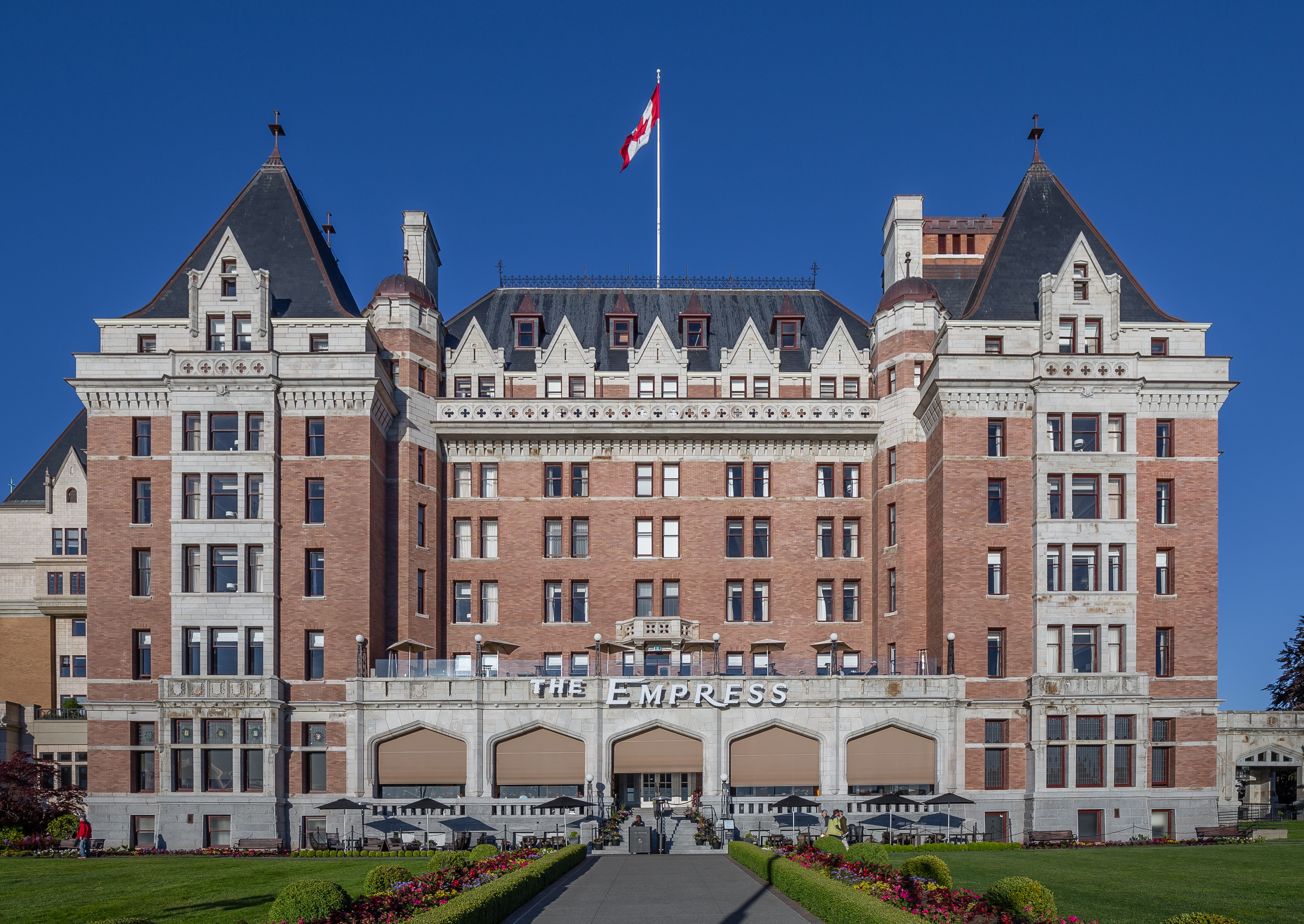
- Interactive map of the Fairmont Empress area
- Former names: The Empress (1908–2001)

General information
- Architectural style: Châteauesque
- Location: 721 Government Street; Victoria, British Columbia; V8W 1W5
- Coordinates: 48.42185°N 123.36797°W
- Construction started: 1904
- Opening: 20 January 1908
- Owner: Bosa Development
- Management: Fairmont Hotels and Resorts

Height
- Height: 35.4 metres (116 ft)

Technical details
- Floor count: 8

Design and construction
- Architect: Francis Rattenbury
- Developer: Canadian Pacific Railway

Other information
- Number of rooms: 412
- Number of suites: 52
- Number of restaurants: 4

Website
- www.fairmont.com/empress-victoria/

National Historic Site of Canada
- Official name: Empress Hotel National Historic Site of Canada
- Designated: 15 January 1981

The Fairmont Empress, formerly and commonly referred to as The Empress, is one of the oldest hotels in Victoria, British Columbia, Canada. Located on 721 Government Street, it is situated in Downtown Victoria, facing the city's Inner Harbour. The hotel was designed by Francis Rattenbury, and was built by Canadian Pacific Hotels, a division of the Canadian Pacific Railway company. The hotel is presently managed by Fairmont Hotels and Resorts, part of AccorHotels since 2016. It is owned by Nat and Flora Bosa of Vancouver.

The Empress Hotel is an elegant hotel with gables, spires, and a gothic architectural style. Opened on 20 January 1908, the Châteauesque-styled building is considered one of Canada's grand railway hotels. Since its opening, the hotel has undergone two expansions, the first from 1910 to 1912, and a second expansion in 1928. The building was designated as a National Historic Site of Canada in January 1981. The Empress underwent a significant restoration between 2015 and 2017, which cost more than $60 million. The hotel commemorated the restoration efforts on 28 June 2017.

== Location ==
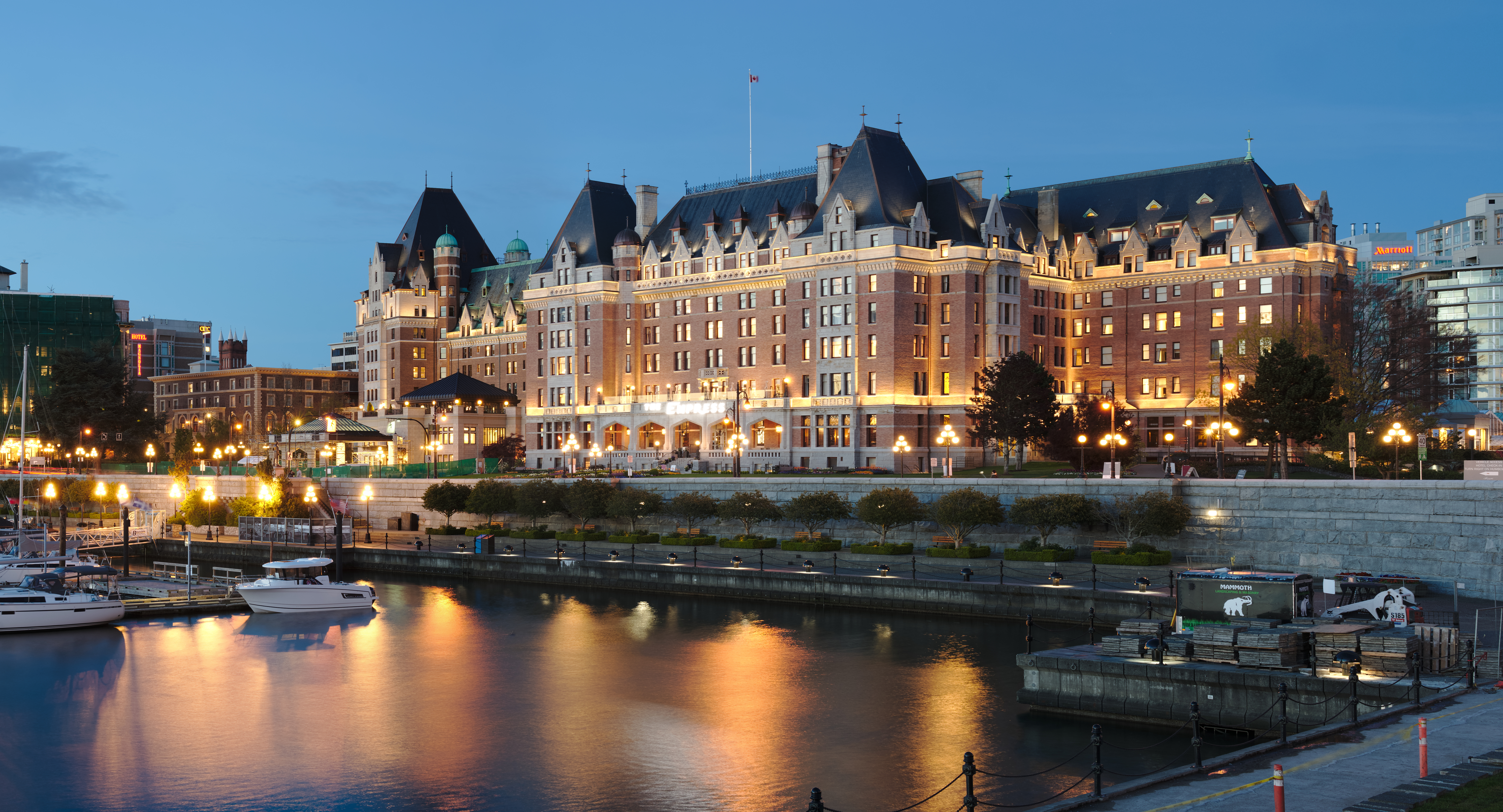
Victoria's Inner Harbour is located west of the hotel, on the other side of Government Street.

The Fairmont Empress sits at 721 Government Street, at the southern end of Downtown Victoria, the central business district for Victoria, British Columbia. The hotel property is bounded by Humboldt Street to the north, Belleville Street to the south, and Government Street to the west. To the east of the hotel is the Victoria Conference Centre, a conference centre connected to the hotel via the conservatory in 1989. The hotel provides catering for the conference centre. The conference centre and hotel are bounded by Douglas Street on the east.

Located at the southern end of Downtown Victoria on Government Street, the hotel is situated close to the British Columbia Parliament Buildings. The hotel is also situated closely to the city's Inner Harbour, a major tourist attraction located west of the hotel, across Government Street. Other major attractions located adjacent to the hotel include the Maritime Museum of British Columbia and the Victoria Bug Zoo, both located north of the hotel, across Humboldt Street.

The hotel building was designated as a National Historic Site of Canada by Parks Canada on 15 January 1981 for its contribution to the development of the Chateauesque style of architecture.

== Design ==
=== Architecture ===
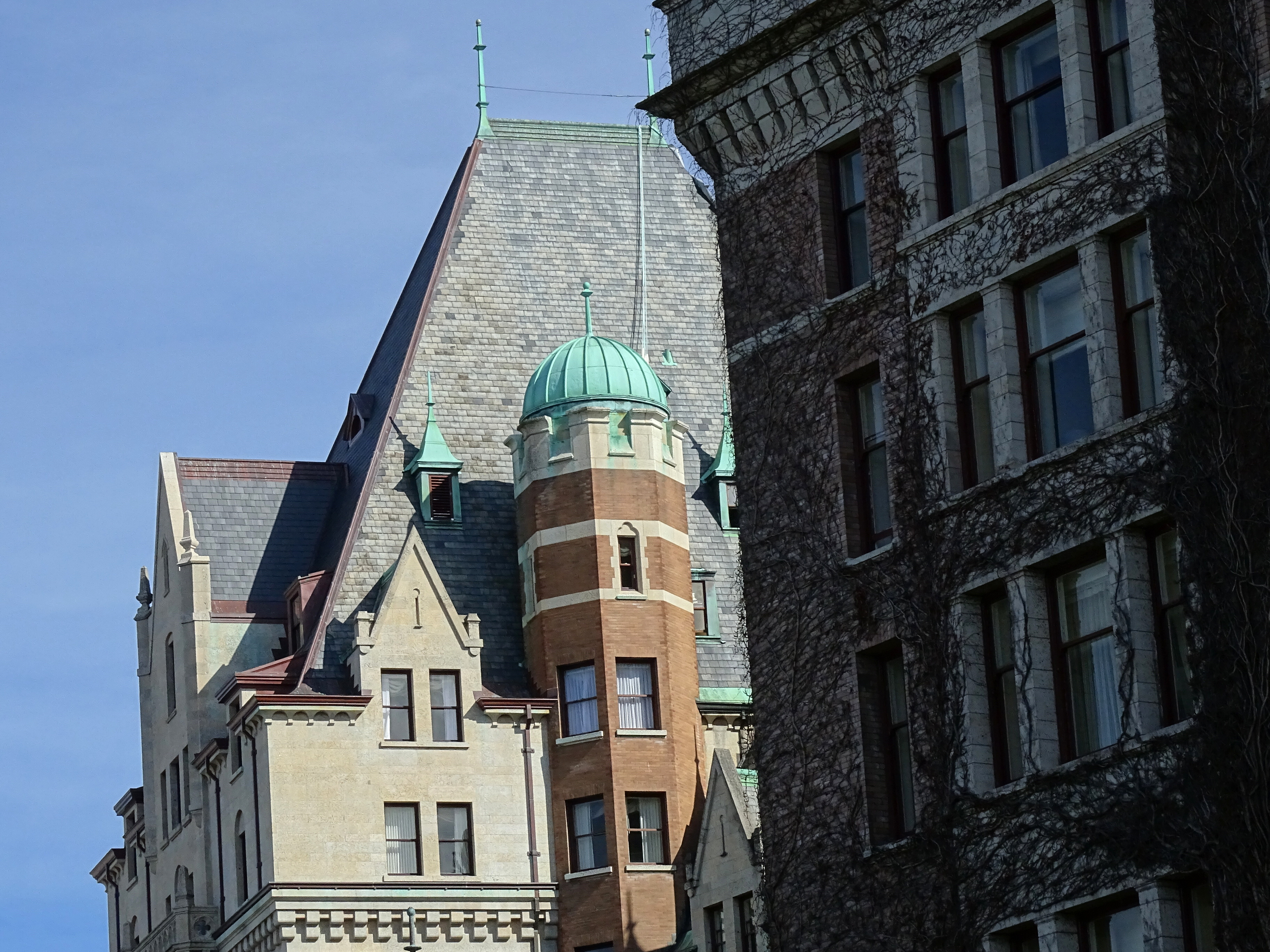
Designed in a Chateauesque-style, the hotel features steep pitched roofs, gables, and polygonal turrets.

Shortly after acquiring the property, Canadian Pacific Hotels, a division of Canadian Pacific Railway, announced its plan to construct a new hotel, similar to the company's other Chateauesque grand railway hotels. Designed by Francis Rattenbury, the hotel was built from 1904 to 1908. Rattenbury's initial plans featured a seven-story hotel similar to the Chateau Frontenac in Quebec City. Incorporating elements of French Renaissance architecture, his designs featured an enormous entrance hall, and a glass-roofed palm garden decorated in a Chinese motif. After months of delays, Rattenbury was relieved as the building's architect on 5 December 1907, with design responsibilities falling to William Sutherland Maxwell, the chief architect for Canadian Pacific Railway.

Like most Chateauesque hotels, the Empress incorporates stone and brick cladding, steep pitched copper roofs, ornate neo-Gothic dormers and gables, and polygonal turrets. However, the design of the hotel also deviates from earlier Chateauesque hotels owned by the company, incorporating elements from contemporary architectural styles into its design. The hotel's porch featured elements of Tudor architecture, the main roof of the hotel was designed in a Second Empire style with a flat top and iron railings. The building features an asymmetrical floor plan, with an interior featuring arcaded central loggia, and projecting pavilions accented by oriel windows.

The Empress was enlarged twice since it opened, with William Sutherland Maxwell designing the building's first expansion, from 1910 to 1912. The building's second expansion was completed in 1928. Much of the building's exterior brick was covered in an overgrowth of ivy, until renovations from 2014 to 2017 saw the bricks repointed and the ivy removed. The removal of the plants was done in order to prevent damage to the bricks, as well as preventing animals from living within the overgrowth.

=== Facilities ===
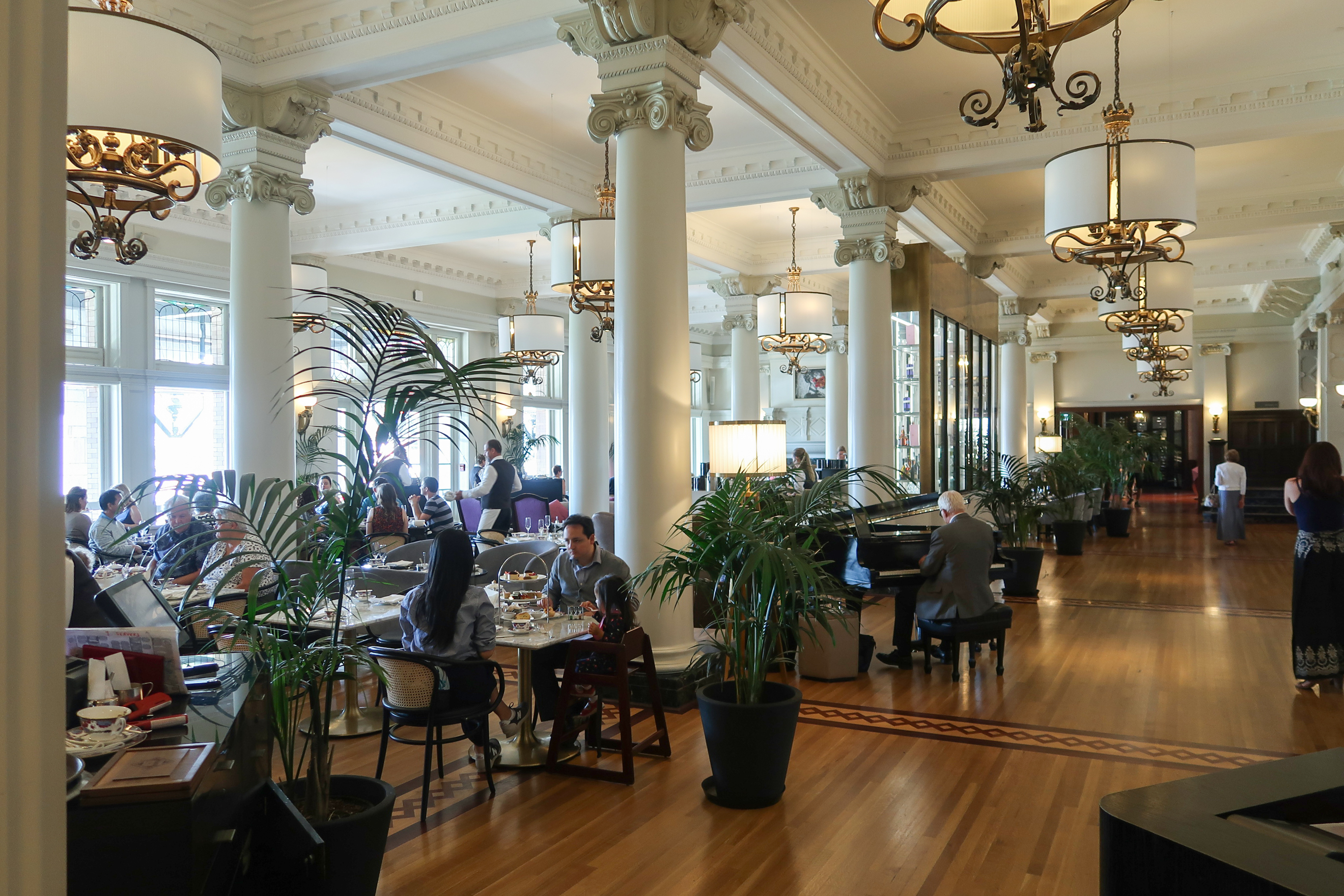
Afternoon tea at the Lobby Lounge, one of several restaurants at the hotel

The Empress includes 464 guest rooms and suites spread throughout the hotel building.

A number of rooms at The Empress are also used by restaurants and other food-based services. Restaurants located within the restaurant include the Lobby Lounge, Q at the Empress Restaurant, and the Q Bar. The restaurants were all redesigned in 2017 by the Puccini Group, a San Francisco-based interior design firm. The restaurants features a purple, hardwood floor, and textured-fabric chandeliers. The hotel's afternoon tea service is held at the Lobby Lounge.

The Willow Stream Spa is a spa facility located within the hotel. It includes a Finnish sauna, steam inhalation room, and mineral pool. The hotel also operates a fitness centre with an indoor pools, and a hot tub.

== History ==
The Chateauesque was designed by Francis Rattenbury for Canadian Pacific Hotels as a terminus hotel for Canadian Pacific's steamship line, whose main terminal was just a block away. The hotel was to serve business people and visitors to Victoria, but later as Canadian Pacific ceased its passenger services to the city, the hotel was successfully remarketed as a resort to tourists. Victoria emerged as a tourist destination beginning in the mid-to-late 1920s.

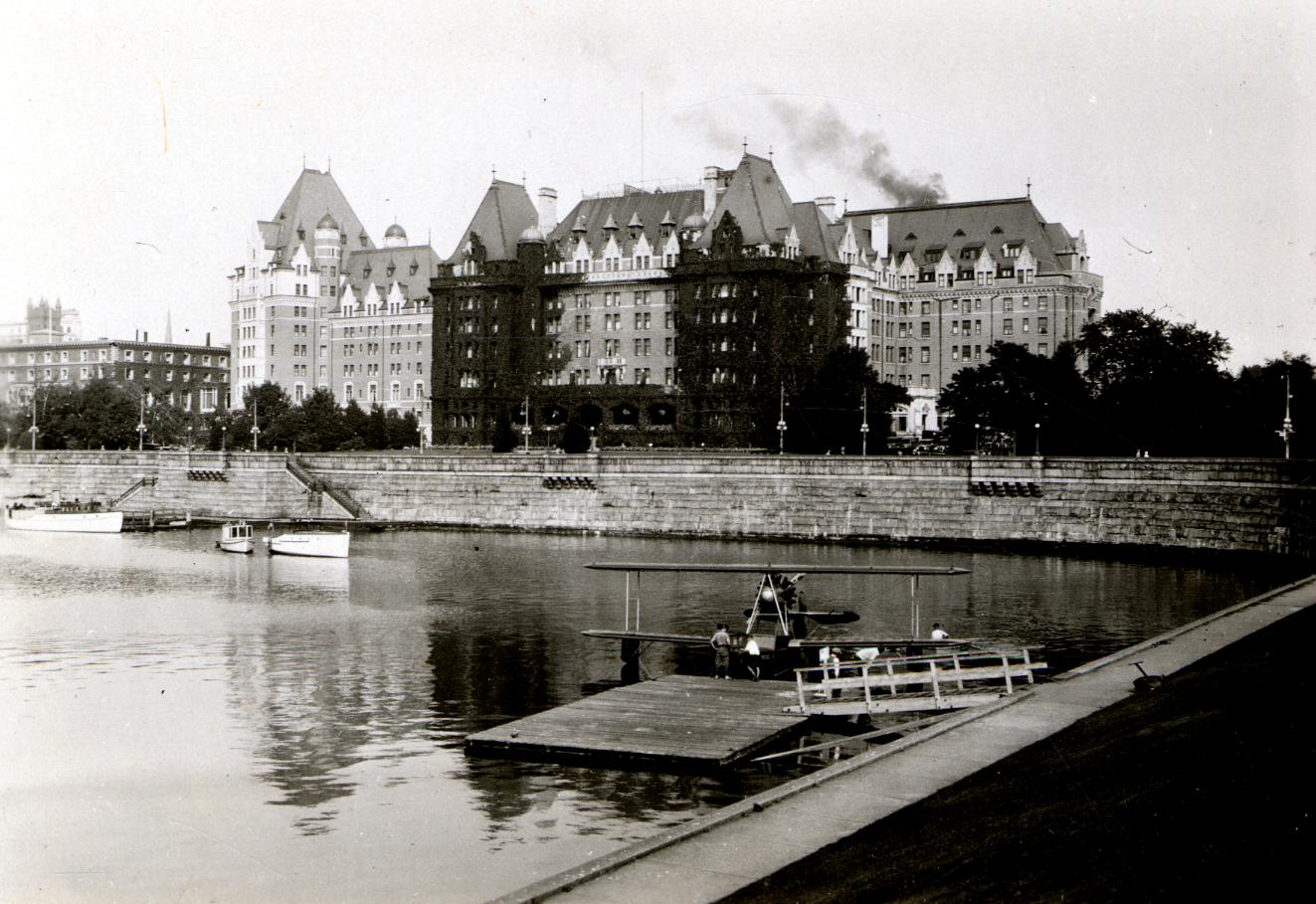
The Empress in August 1930, years after the hotel's expansion in 1928

The hotel was built between 1904 and 1908, opening for service in that year and named for Queen Victoria, who was also Empress of India. Additional wings were added between 1909 and 1914, and in 1928. In 1919, Edward, Prince of Wales attended a gala at the hotel's Crystal Ballroom.

In the 1930s, Shirley Temple arrived accompanied by her parents amid rumours that she had fled from California because of kidnapping threats, a story borne from the presence of two huge bodyguards who took the room opposite hers and always left their door open. On May 30, 1939, King George VI and Queen Elizabeth attended a luncheon at the Empress during their 1939 royal tour of Canada.

Until 1960 the hotel did not have a sign above the front entrance. In 1965, debate to tear down The Empress to make room for a more modern, functional high-rise hotel surfaced. One local newspaper warned that, "Without this splendid relic of the Edwardian era, literally tens of thousands of tourists will never return. This is the Mecca, this is the heart and soul of the city." However, on 10 June 1966, the hotel's ownership announced that they would not be demolished, but would embark on a $4 million renovation and refurbishment program, playfully dubbed Operation Teacup.

In 1989, over $45 million was spent in additional restoration known as The Royal Restoration. Guest rooms were renovated, and a health club, indoor swimming pool and guest reception were added. During these renovation, the engineering staff from the hotel confirmed that there was what has been described as a tunnel that ran from James Bay into the basement of the Empress. At high tide one was able to visit the basement and see the salt water flood the opening. It is not clear what the purpose was. Some have suggested that it was part of the hotel's waste management system and that at one time the sewage from the hotel was being flushed into James Bay.

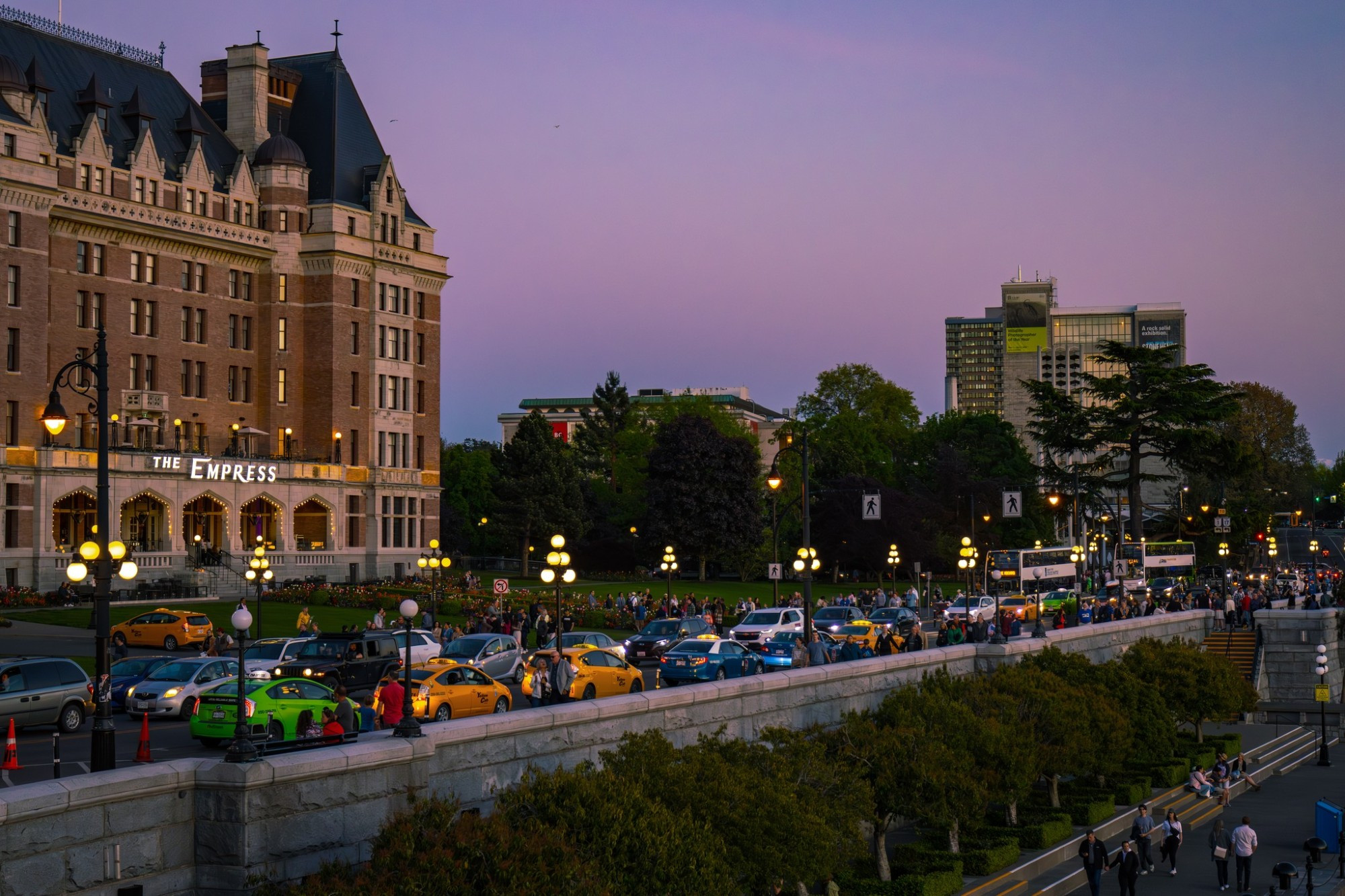
The Empress Hotel and Inner Harbour Causeway in May 2024

In 1999, Canadian Pacific spun off Canadian Pacific Hotels, along with all its properties. The new company was renamed Fairmont Hotels & Resorts in an effort to reflect its growing global presence and ambitions. As such, all former CP Hotel properties were to be renamed and rebranded with the prefix 'Fairmont'. This led to a loud uproar and consternation by Victoria's newspapers and its citizens, a decision they viewed as sacrilege. Although the new name stuck, Fairmont made no changes to the hotel's original exterior signage, as a compromise to soothe local anxieties and respect its heritage.

Fairmont later sold the hotel on October 31, 2000, to the Legacy Hotels REIT for CA$120 million. However, Fairmont has a long-term management agreement with Legacy Hotels, and as of August 2005, held an 11.14% ownership in this REIT. The hotel was sold again on June 27, 2014, to Vancouver-based owners, Nat and Flora Bosa. They invested more than $60 million in renovations. In May 2017, the first phase of restoration work and renovation was completed at the hotel. The renovations included redesigns of the guest rooms and suites, spa, dining facilities, and reception lobby.

== See also ==
- List of historic places in Victoria, British Columbia
- Royal eponyms in Canada
