= Government Street (Victoria, British Columbia) =

Street in Victoria, British Columbia

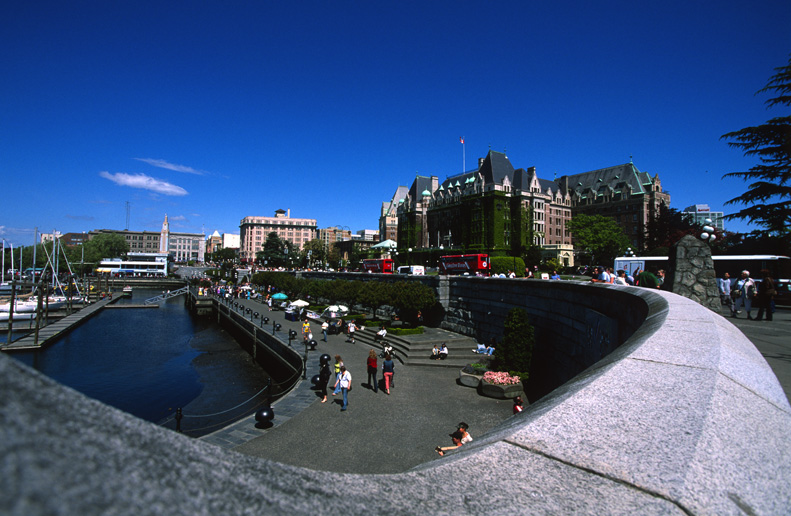
View of the Inner Harbour looking north with VRTS double decked buses along Government Street in front of The Empress, 30 April 2005.

Government Street is a major road in Victoria, British Columbia.

The street runs from an intersection with Douglas Street, which it runs parallel with, all the way through downtown Victoria. It terminates at Dallas Road.

Government Street is popular with tourists as many tourist attractions, such as The Fairmont Empress and Inner Harbour, are located on the road. The Royal British Columbia Museum and the British Columbia Parliament Buildings, can be seen on the nearby Belleville Street. It also features Chinatown Victoria. There are also many restaurants, hotels, shops, and multiple souvenir stores along it. 207 Government Street is the location of the Emily Carr House a National Historic Site of Canada.

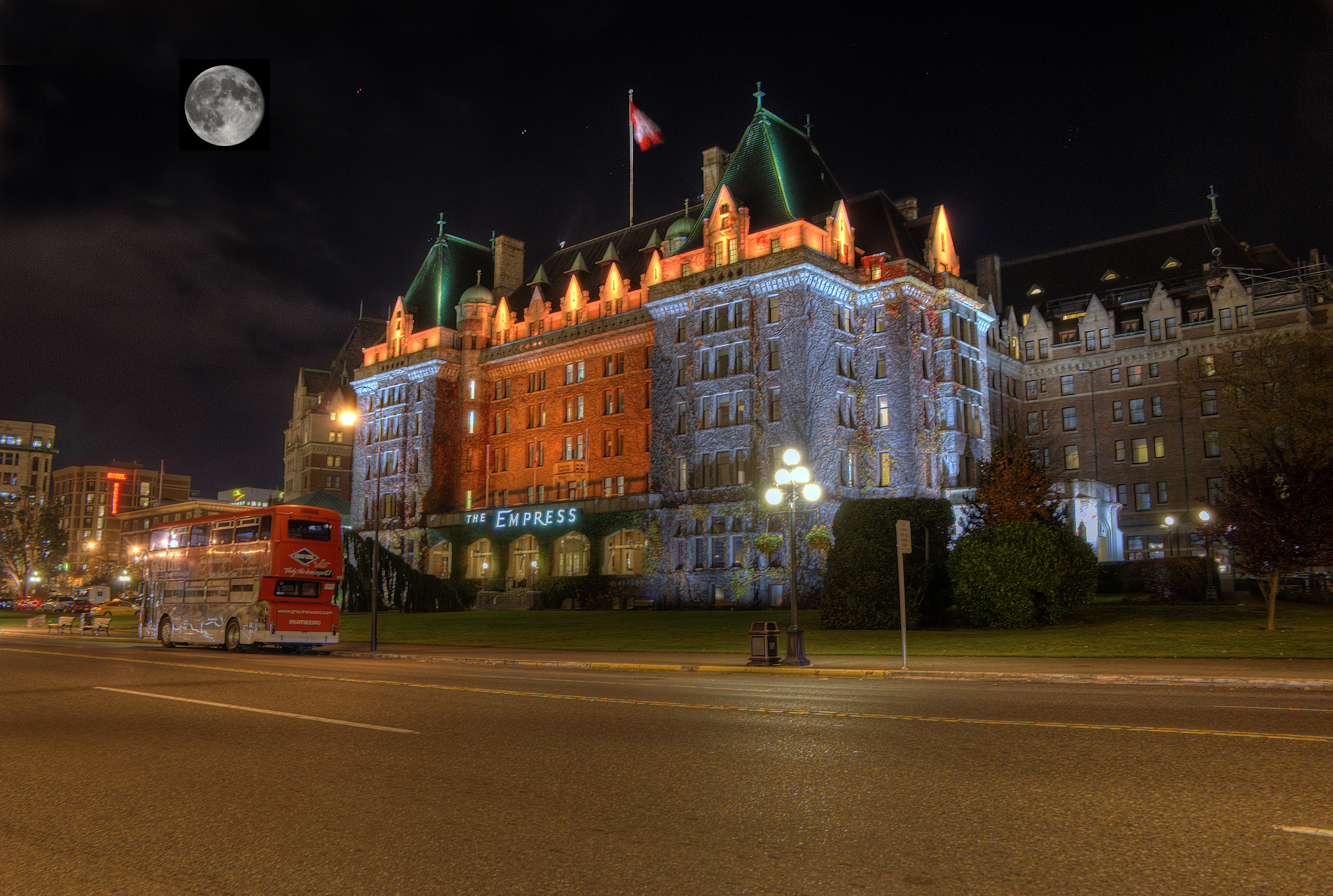
Closer view of The Empress at night with Government Street in the foreground, 12 November 2009.
