= L'Androuno =

Narrow street in Gassin, France

Coordinates: 43.2285°N 6.5851°E

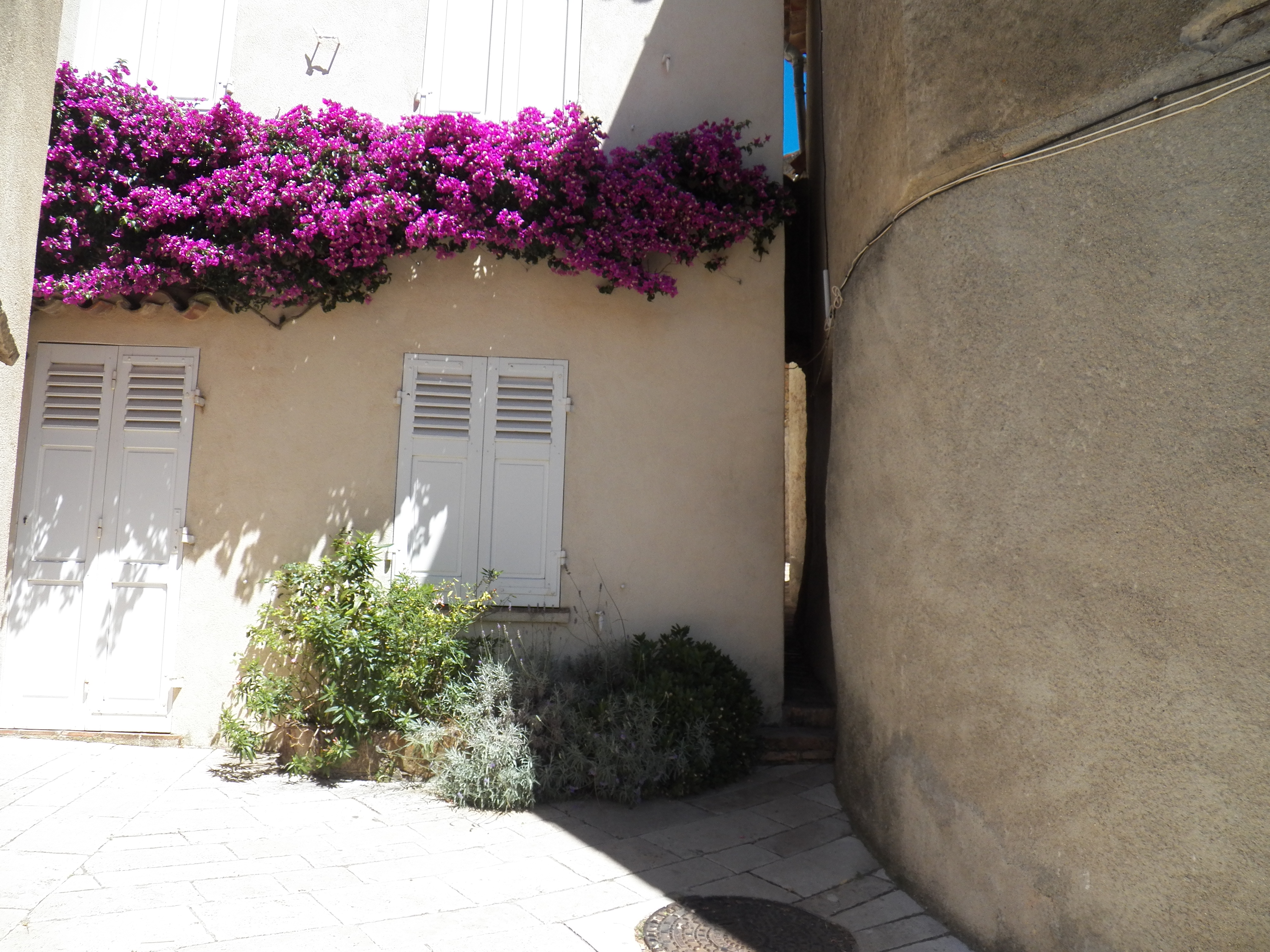
A view of the Androuno

L'Androuno is one of the world's narrowest streets found in the city of Gassin, France.

It measures 29 centimeters (11.41 inches) at its narrowest point.

This provençal name derives from a Greek term for a passage between two houses, with a subtext for a place for men only, such as a hiding place or a latrine. The Provencal term is defined as an "alley", a "cul-de-sac", or a "void that separates two houses", with the same subtext.

== See also ==
- Spreuerhofstraße: A narrow street in Germany
- Fan Tan Alley: A narrow street in Canada
- Mårten Trotzigs Gränd: A narrow street in Sweden
- Parliament Street, Exeter: A narrow street in the United Kingdom
- Strada sforii: A narrow street in Romania
- 9 de Julio Avenue: The widest street in the world in Buenos Aires
