= Ning Young Building =

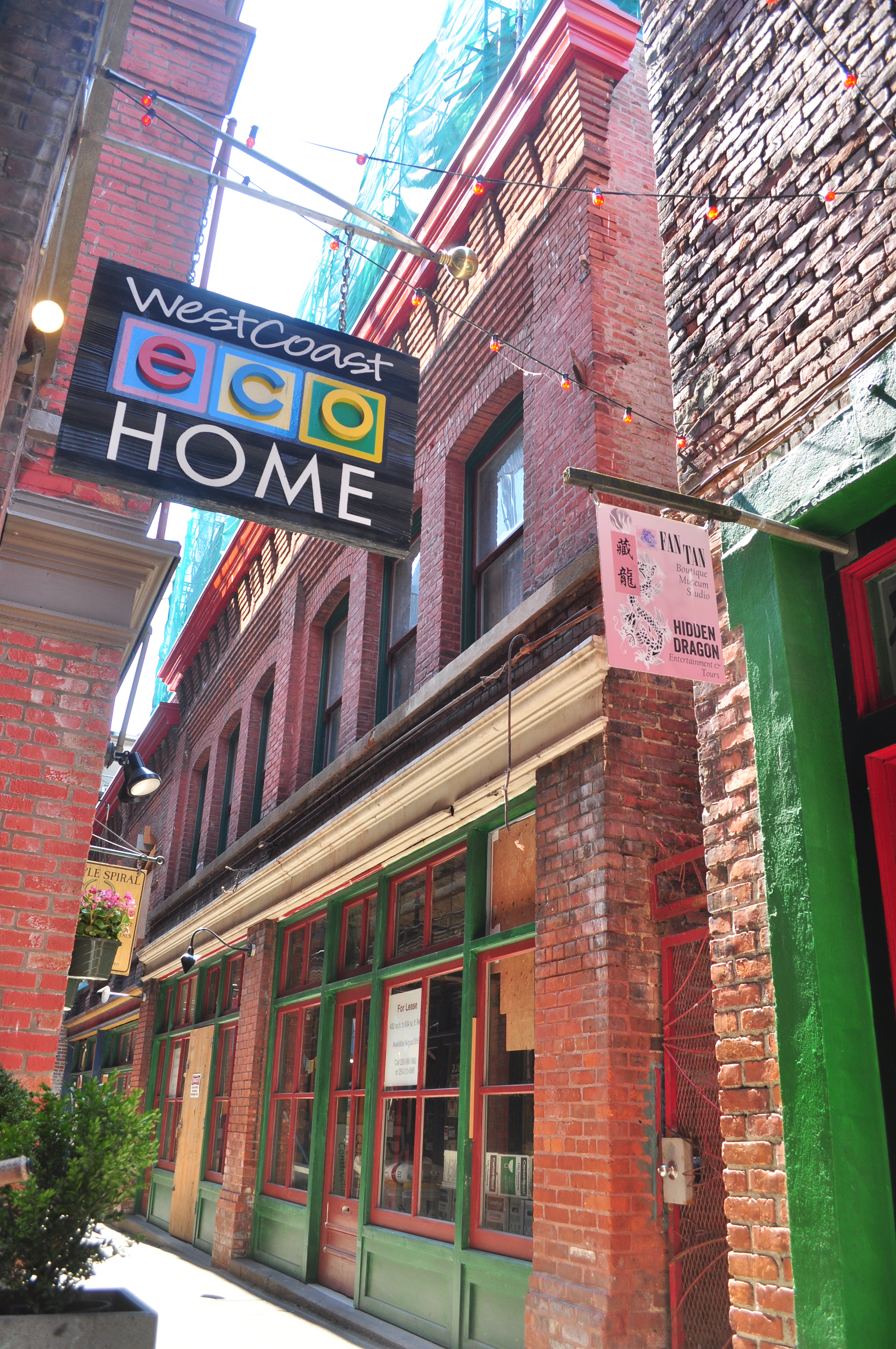
- The building's exterior in 2015
- Interactive map of the Ning Young Building area

General information
- Location: 4 Fan Tan Alley, Victoria, British Columbia, Canada
- Coordinates: 48.4288°N 123.3679°W
- Completed: 1920

The Ning Young Building is a historic building in Victoria, British Columbia, Canada. It is located on Fan Tan Alley, in the city's Chinatown area.

== See also ==
- List of historic places in Victoria, British Columbia
