= Jean-Jacques Avril =

French engraver (1744–1831)

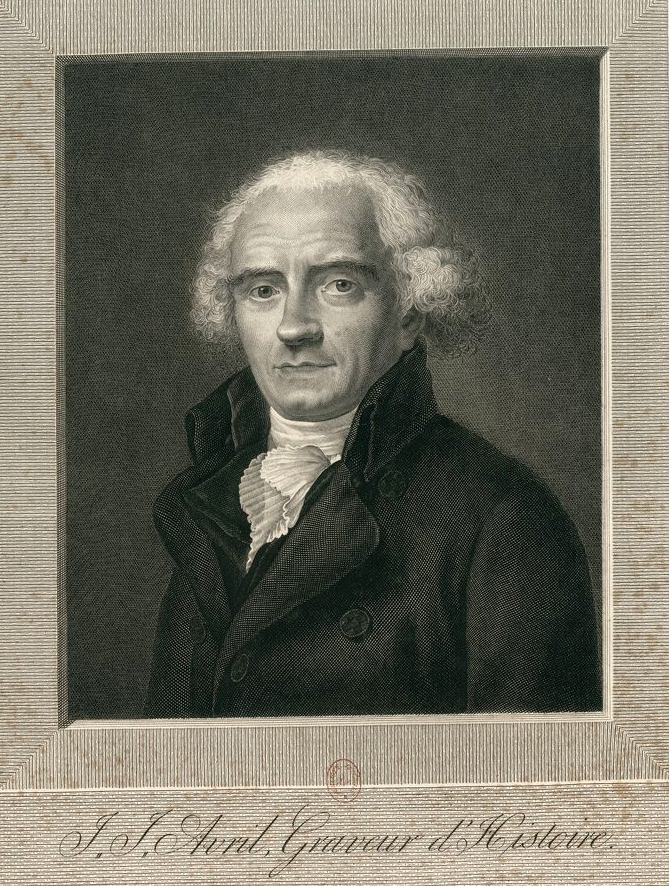
Jean-Jacques Avril

Jean-Jacques Avril "the elder" (1744–1831) was a French artist, reproductive engraver, printmaker born in Paris who made about 540 engravings, some of large dimensions. He was a pupil of Johann Georg Wille. He died in Paris in 1831.

His prints bear addresses in the Rue de la Huchette and the Rue du Petit Bourbon.

== Works ==
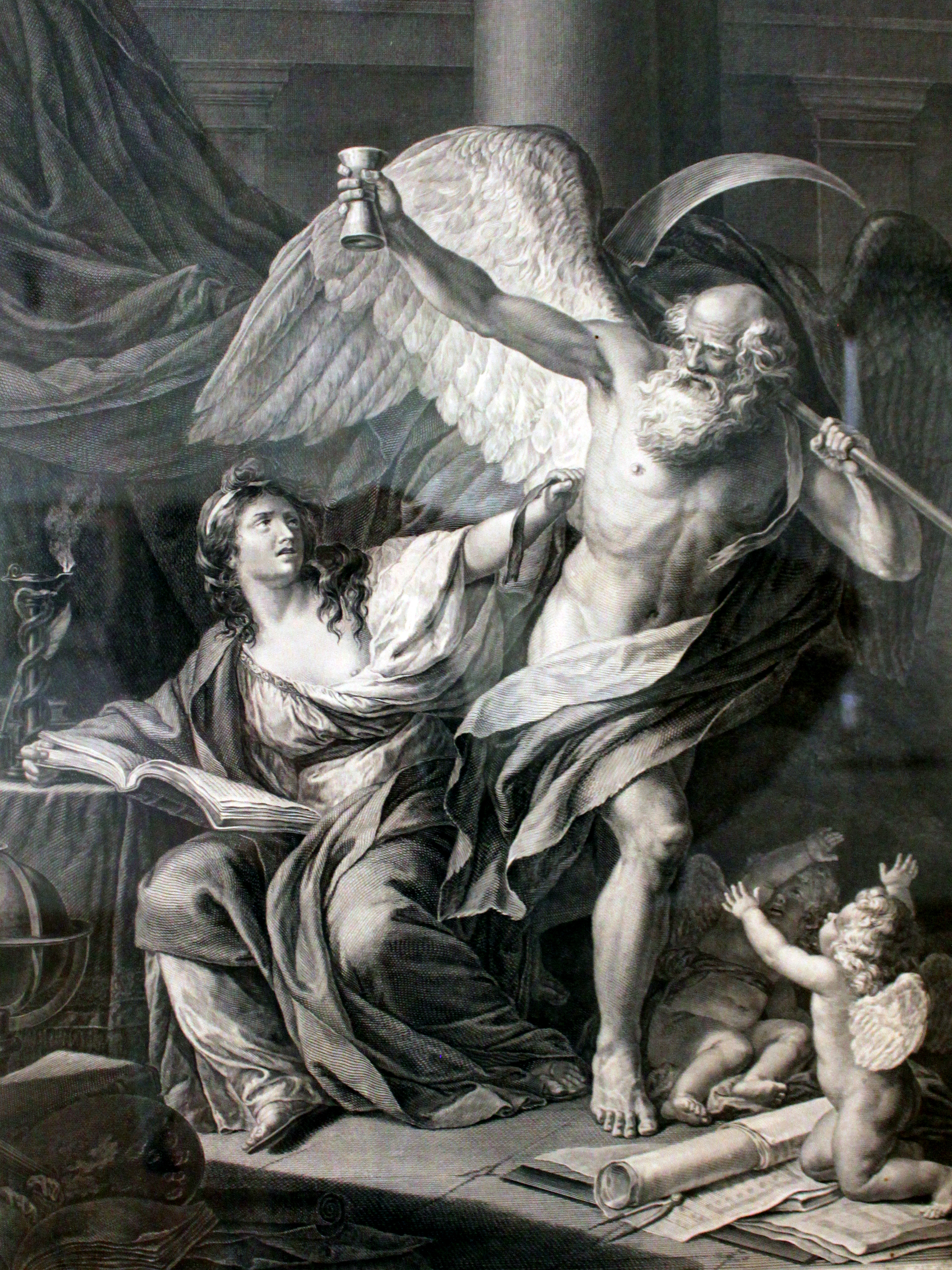
"Study Wanting to Hold Back Time" by Jean-Jacques Avril. National Art Museum of Azerbaijan, Baku

Media related to Jean-Jacques Avril at Wikimedia Commons

His engravings include:

- Study Wanting to Hold Back Time; after François-Guillaume Ménageot
- La Vierge au linge; after Raphael.
- Mars Going to Battle; after Rubens.
- Mars Returning from Battle; after the same.
- A Shepherd and Shepherdess; called the Croc-en-jambe; after the same.
- Apollo with the Seasons, dancing; after Poussin.
- Diana and Actaeon; after Albani.
- Diana and Callisto; after the same.
- Venus revenging herself on Psyche; after De Troy.
- Pygmalion and Galatea; after Marillier.
- St. Genevieve; after C. van Loo.
- Fishermen returning; after Vernet.
- Travellers in a Storm; after the same.
- The Shipwreck; dated 1775; after the same.
- The Double Recompense of Merit; after P. A. Wille, 1784.
- French Patriotism; after the same. 1788.
- The Taking of Courtrai; after Van der Meulen. 1782.
- The Passage of the Rhine; after Berchem.
- Catherine II on her Travels; after F. de Meys. 1790.
- Ulysses and Penelope; after Le Barbier.
- Combat of the Horatii and Curiatii; after the same. 1787.
