= Strada Sforii =

Thoroughfare in Brașov, Romania

Coordinates: 45°38′23″N 25°35′19″E

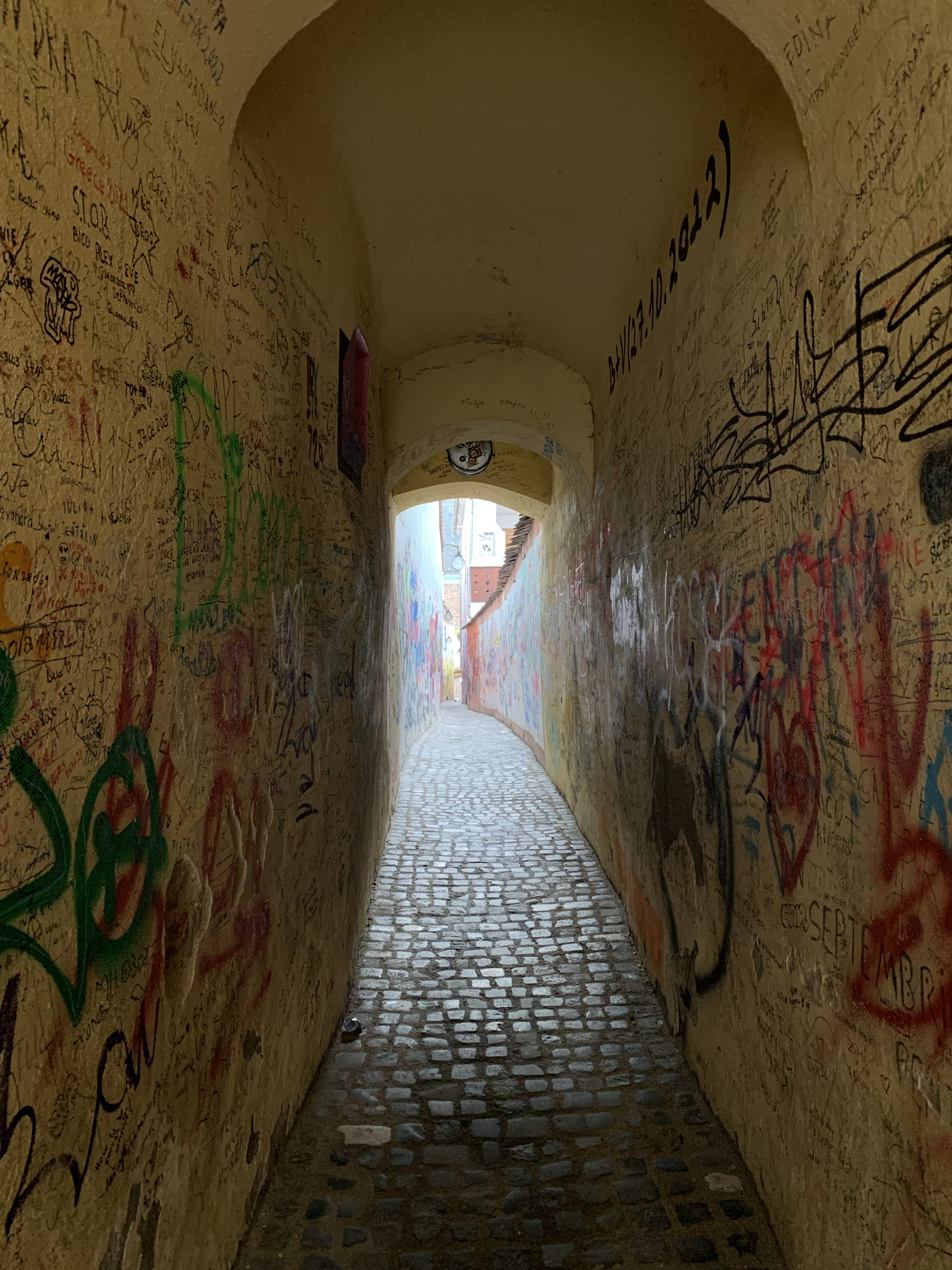
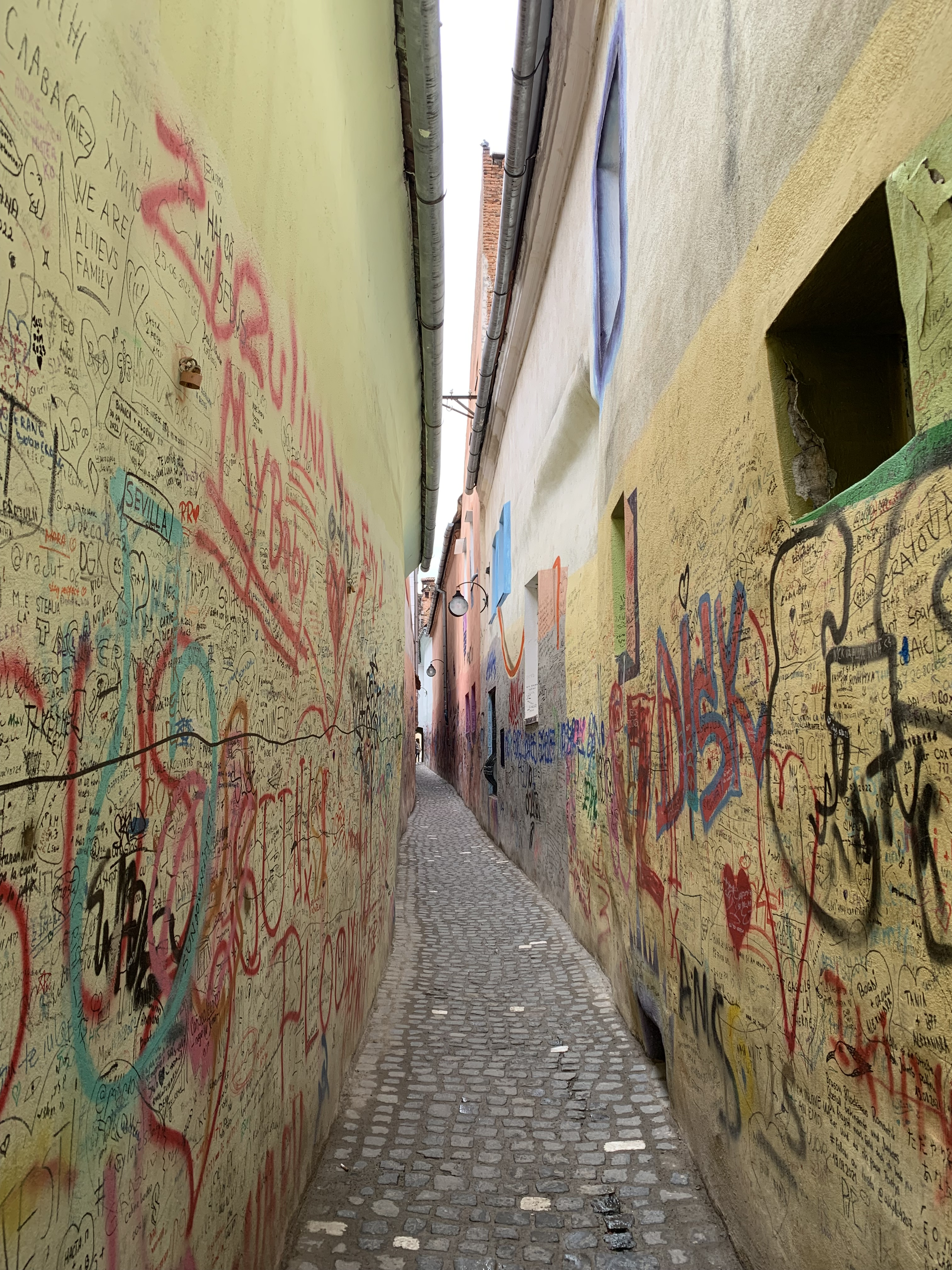
Various sections of the graffiti-covered walls of the Strada Sforii, 2023

Strada Sforii (Romanian pronunciation: [ˈstrada ˈsforij], "Rope Street", originally Schnurgässchen or Fadengasse, "Thread/Cord Lane" in German) is the narrowest street in the city of Brașov, Romania. It is believed to be one of the narrowest streets in Europe (a few are narrower: Spreuerhofstraße in Germany, which holds the Guinness World Record, L'Androuno in France, and Parliament Street in England).

It is situated near Șchei Gate and it is perpendicular to Strada Cerbului (German: Hirschstraße, meaning 'Stag Street' in both languages). It was initially built as a corridor that firemen could use, and it is first mentioned in 17th-century documents. Strada Sforii is now a tourist attraction and meeting spot. Its width varies between 111 and 135 centimetres (44 and 53 in), and it is 80 metres (260 ft) long.

== Name ==
It was first mentioned in 1674 as am aynyen Gäsken. Later German names include stinkender Gang ("stinky passageway", 1736), Zwerg Gässel ("Dwarf Lane", 1805), and Schnurgässchen ("Cord Lane", 1873). In modern German descriptions it usually appears as Fadengasse ("Twine Lane"), although some still refer to it as Schnurgässchen.

The Hungarian name Sinor utca (modern name: Zsinór utca, "String Street") was recorded in 1873, and the Romanian Strada Sfoarei in 1937.

Fadengasse (German for "Thread Lane") should not be confused with Zwirngasse, the southeastern section of today's Strada Michael Weiss.

== Gallery ==
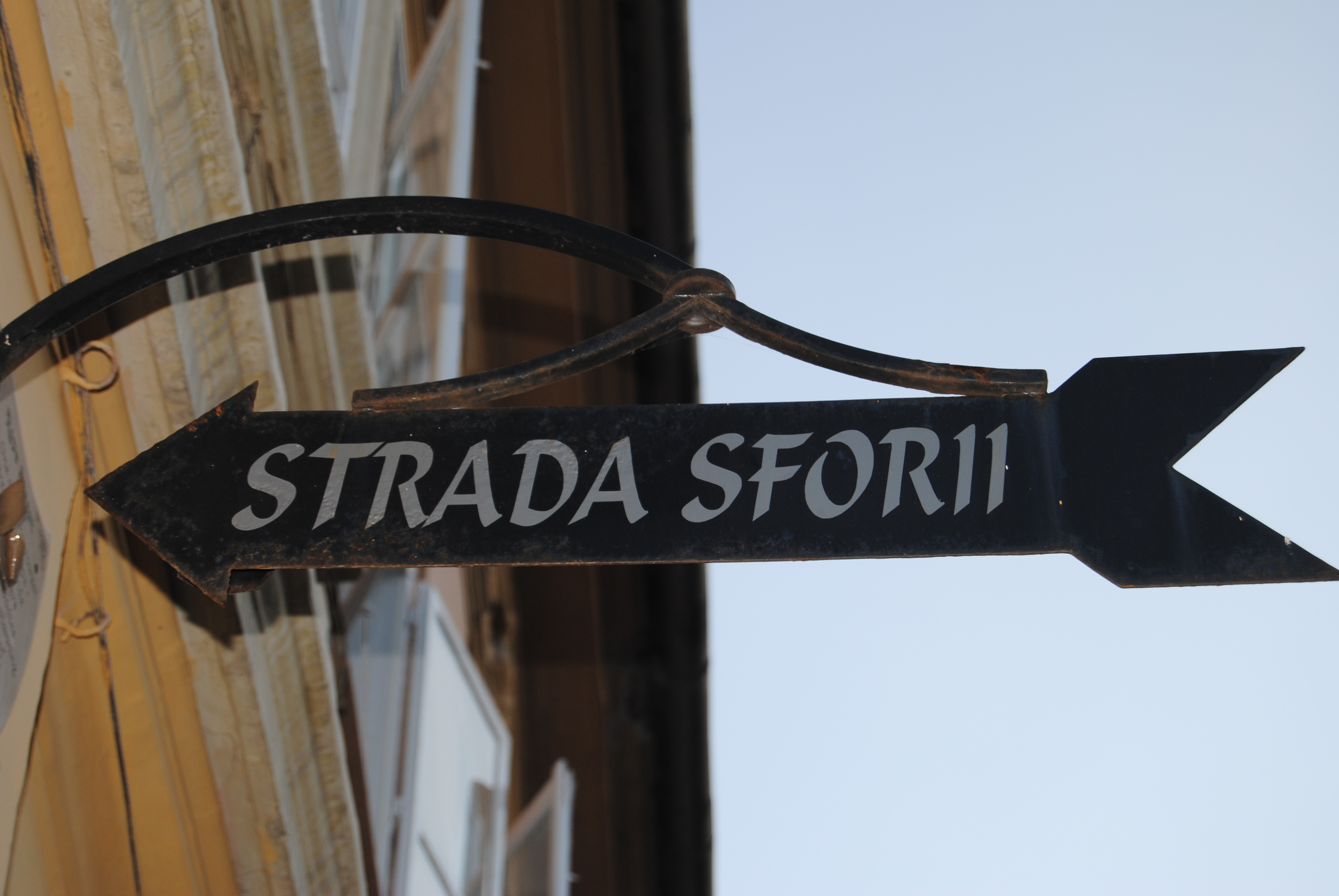
Street sign (2012)

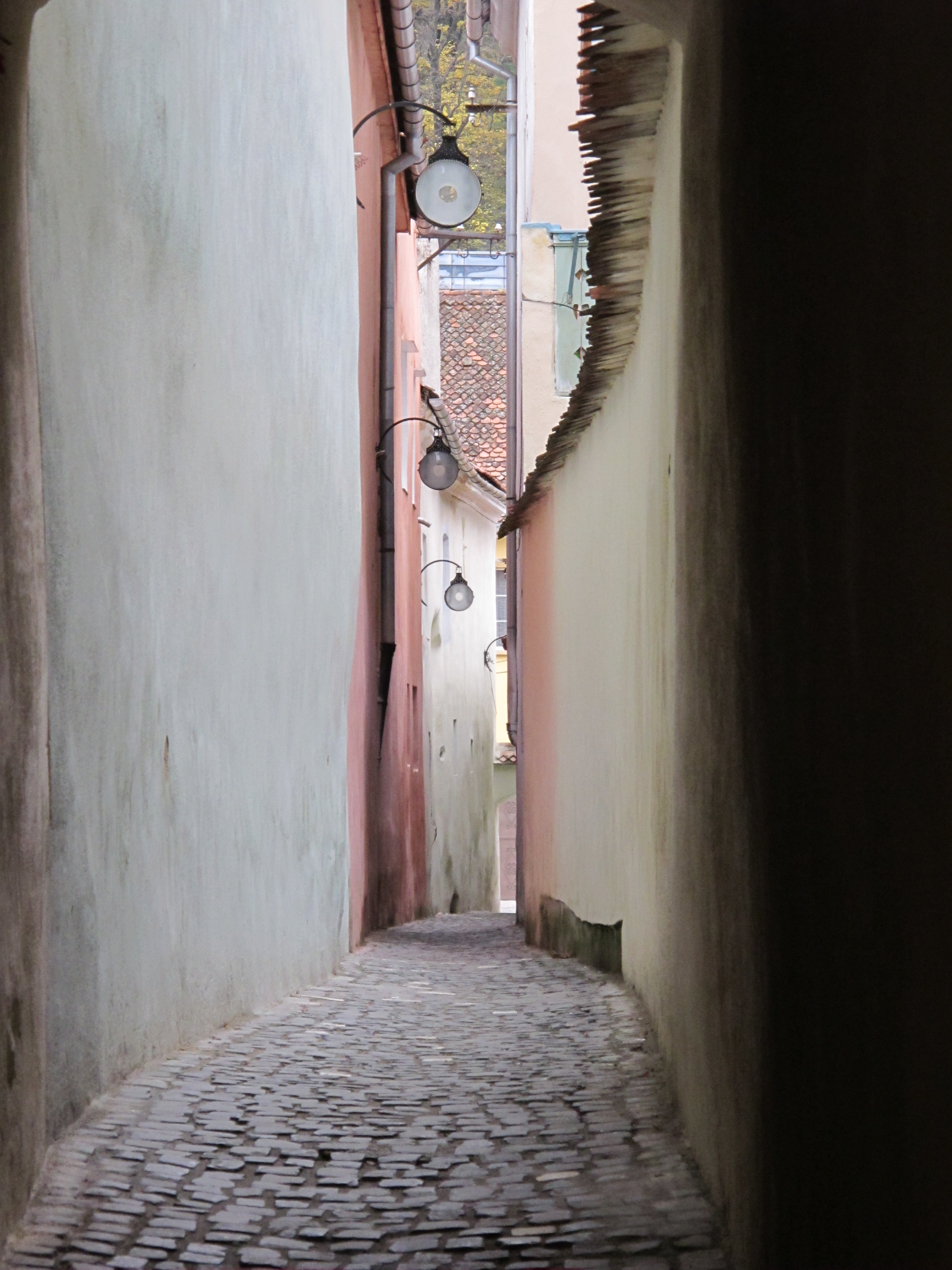
A man cannot fully spread his arms while on Strada Sforii (2009)

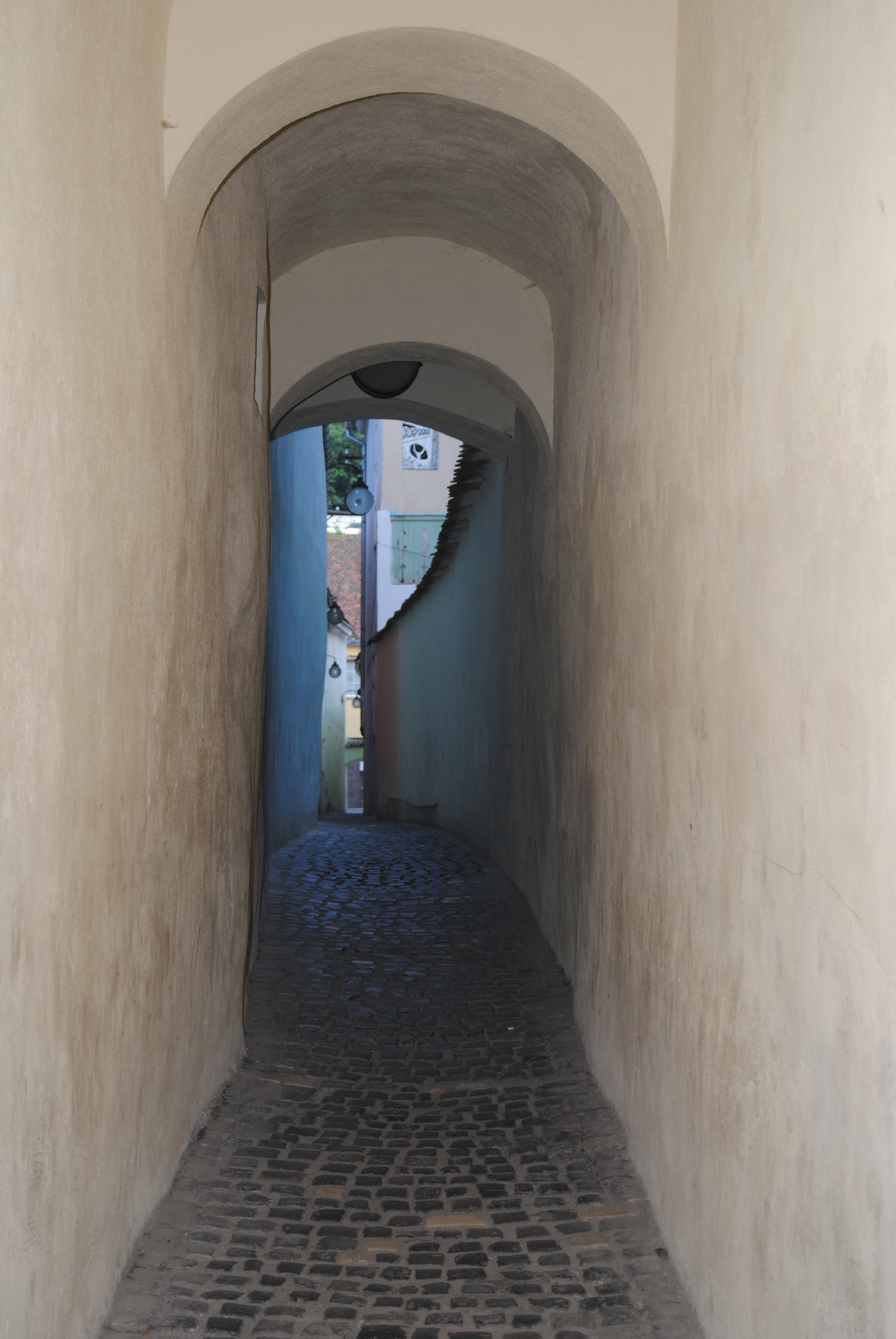
Strada sforii (2012)

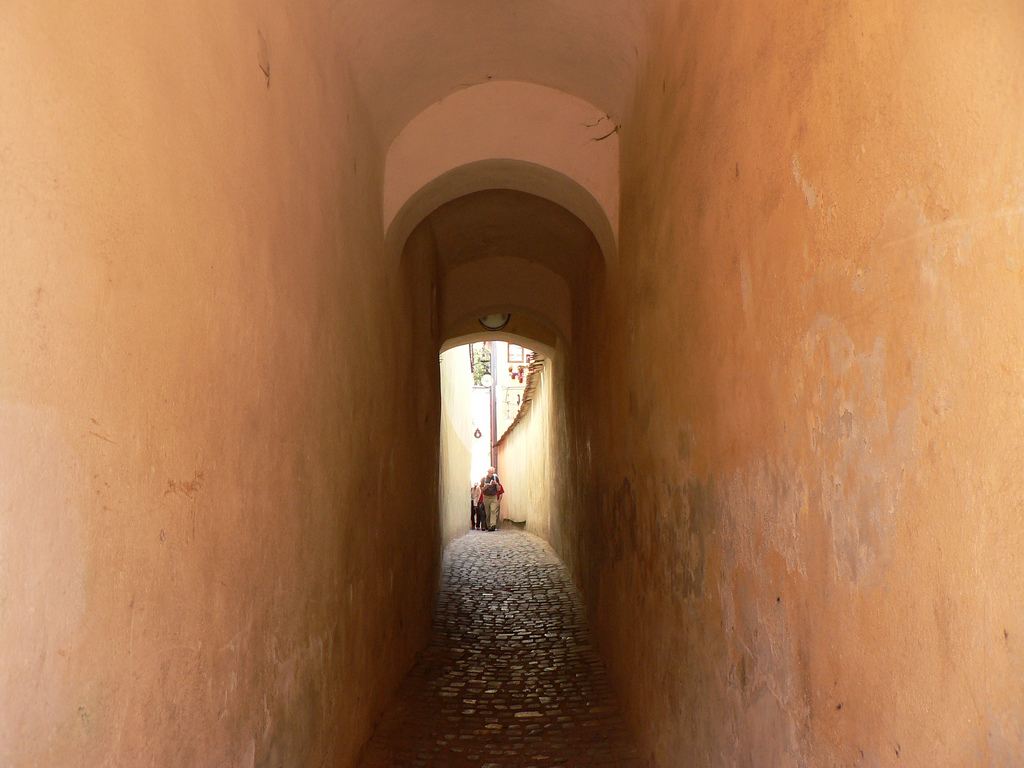
Strada Sforii (2009)

== See also ==
Narrow streets

- L'Androuno, France
- Fan Tan Alley, Canada
- Mårten Trotzigs Gränd, Sweden
- Parliament Street, Exeter, United Kingdom
- Spreuerhofstraße, Germany
