= Parliament Street =

Parliament Street may refer to:

- Parliament Street, Exeter, one of the world's narrowest streets in Exeter, England
- The southern extension of Whitehall in London, leading to Parliament Square and the Parliament of the United Kingdom
- The start of the A562 road in Toxteth, Liverpool
- Parliament Street (Toronto), a street in Toronto, Canada running east of downtown from the Harbour to Bloor Street
- Parliament Street, Dublin, a street in the Irish capital that runs from Dame Street to the Liffey quays
- Parliament Street, Hull, a street in Kingston-upon-Hull in East Yorkshire, United Kingdom
- A main shopping street through Harrogate, United Kingdom
- Parliament Street (York), one of the main shopping streets in York, United Kingdom
- Sansad Marg, an area of New Delhi, also known as Parliament Street
