= Rue du Chat-qui-Pêche =

Candidate for narrowest street in Paris

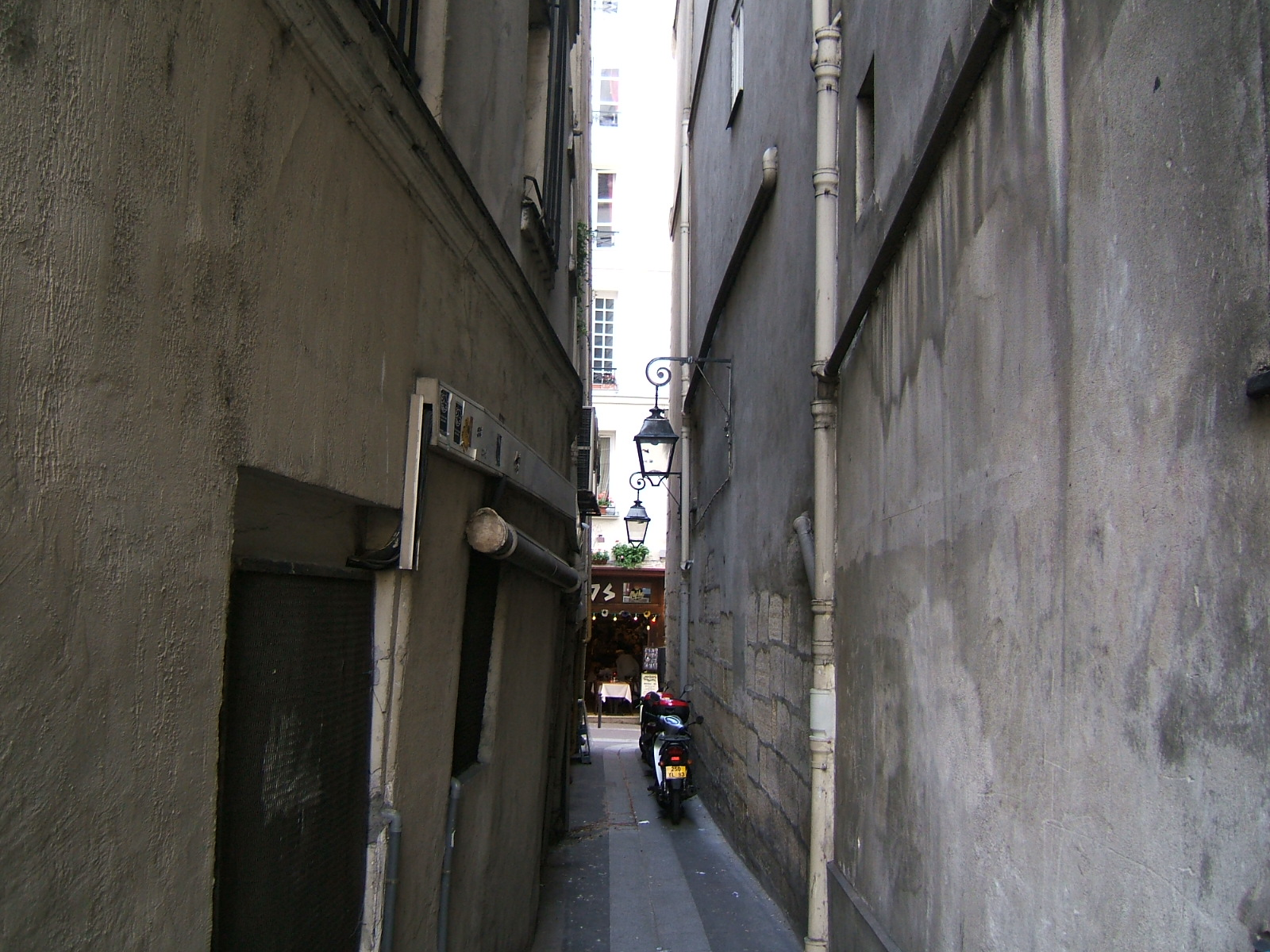
- Seen from the Quai Saint-Michel

- Location within Paris
- Length: 29 m (32 yd; 95 ft 2 in)
- Width: 1.80 m (5 ft 11 in)
- Arrondissement: 5th
- Quarter: Sorbonne
- Coordinates: 48°51′11″N 2°20′46″E
- From: 9 Quai Saint-Michel
- To: Rue de la Huchette

Construction
- Completion: 1540

The Rue du Chat-qui-Pêche (French pronunciation: [ʁy dy ʃa ki pɛʃ], lit. 'Street of the Fishing Cat') is considered the narrowest street in Paris. It is only 1.80 m (5 ft 11 in) wide for the whole of its 29 m (32 yd; 95 ft 2 in) length.

It is in the 5th arrondissement, on the Rive Gauche of the Seine, and runs from the Quai Saint-Michel to the Rue de la Huchette.

== History ==
Built in 1540, it then ended on the bank of the river Seine.

While the Rue du Chat-qui-Pêche is the narrowest street in Paris by overall width, it is not the narrowest by minimum width. Accordingly, the status of "narrowest" street in Paris is also conferred on the Sentier des Merisiers in the 12th arrondissement, with a minimum width of 87 cm (2 ft 10 in), and the Passage de la Duée in the 20th arrondissement, which had a minimum width of 80 cm (2 ft 7 in) before one side was redeveloped in 1970.

== Origin of the name ==
The original name was the Rue des Étuves (transl. Street of the Ovens – transl. Street of the Baths) or Ruelle des Étuves, and at various times it has also been known as the Rue du Renard (not to be confused with the current Rue du Renard, in the 4th arrondissement) and the Rue des Bouticles (transl. Street of the Shops).

Its current name is attested by 1636 as the Rue du Chat qui pesche (using the then-current spelling of the French verb pêcher). This name comes from the sign of a fishmongery, whose owner, a canon, Dom Perlet, owned a black cat known for its ability to catch fish from the Seine with a single swipe of its paw.

Both Chat-qui-Pêche and Chat-qui-pêche are considered proper capitalizations of the street's name.

== Literature ==
Jolán Földes, a Hungarian author, lived on this street in 1930, and gave its name to one of her novels: A halászó macska uccája, which is the literal translation of the name in Hungarian.

The street's name appears twice in the works of Juan Gelman and in Umberto Eco's The Prague Cemetery.

This street is also mentioned in the book Pancakes – Paris by Claire Huchet Bishop, illustrated by Georges Schreiber published in 1947 by the Viking Press.

== Access ==
It is located near the Métro station Saint-Michel, and may be accessed by any of its cross streets, including the Rue de la Huchette.

== See also ==
- La Maison du chat-qui-pelote
- Mårten Trotzigs Gränd
