= Fan-Tan =

Gambling game long played in China

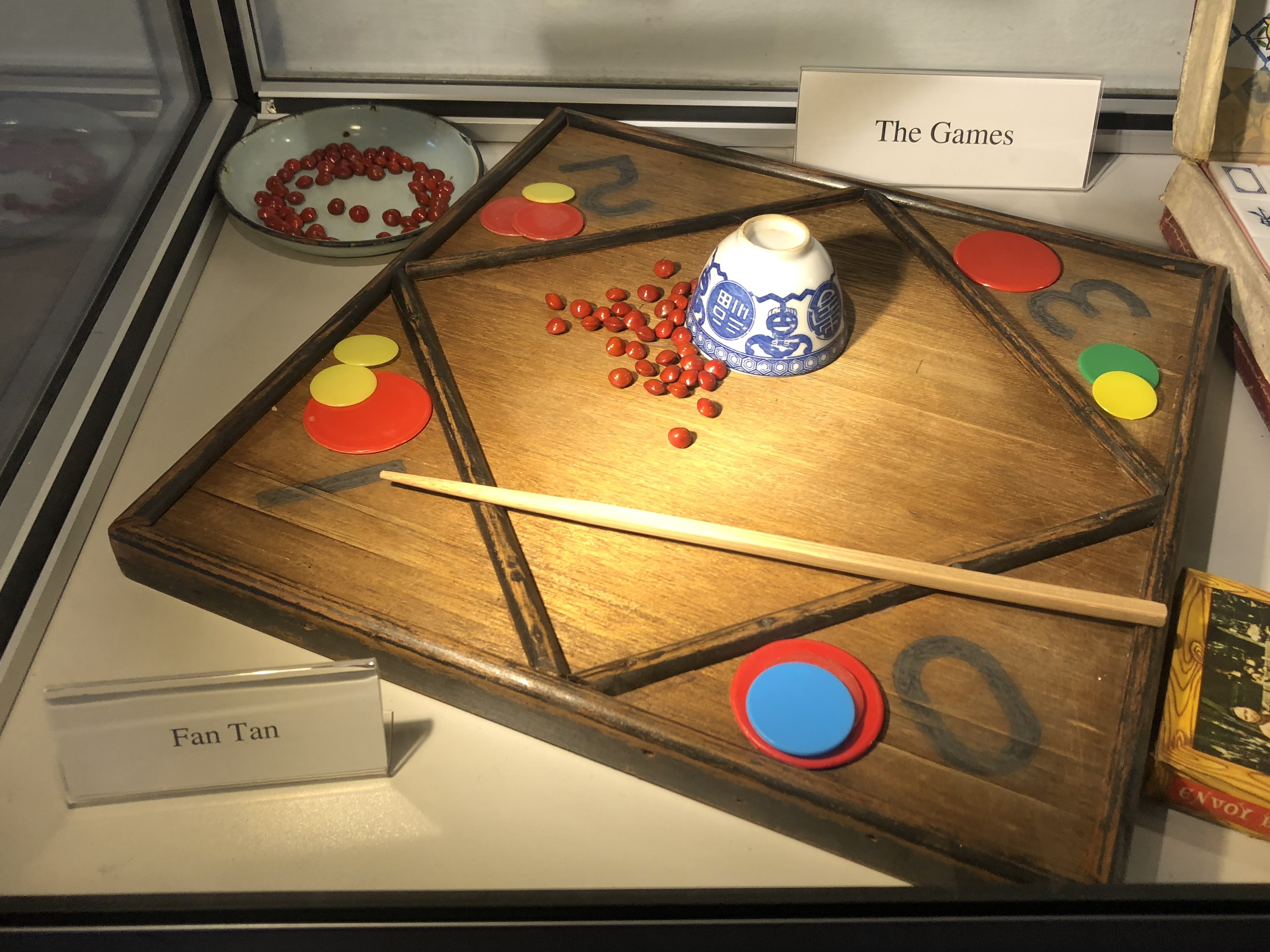
- Board and components for Fan-Tan
- Publication: c. 380; 1646 years ago
- Genres: Guessing game, gambling
- Chance: Pure

Fan-Tan, or fantan (simplified Chinese: 番摊; traditional Chinese: 番攤; pinyin: fāntān; Jyutping: faan1 taan1; lit. 'repeated divisions') is a gambling game long played in China. It is a game of pure chance.

The game is played by placing two handfuls of small objects on a board and guessing the remaining count when divided by four. After players have cast bets on values of 1 through 4, the dealer or croupier repeatedly removes four objects from the board until only one, two, three or four beans remain, determining the winner.

== History ==
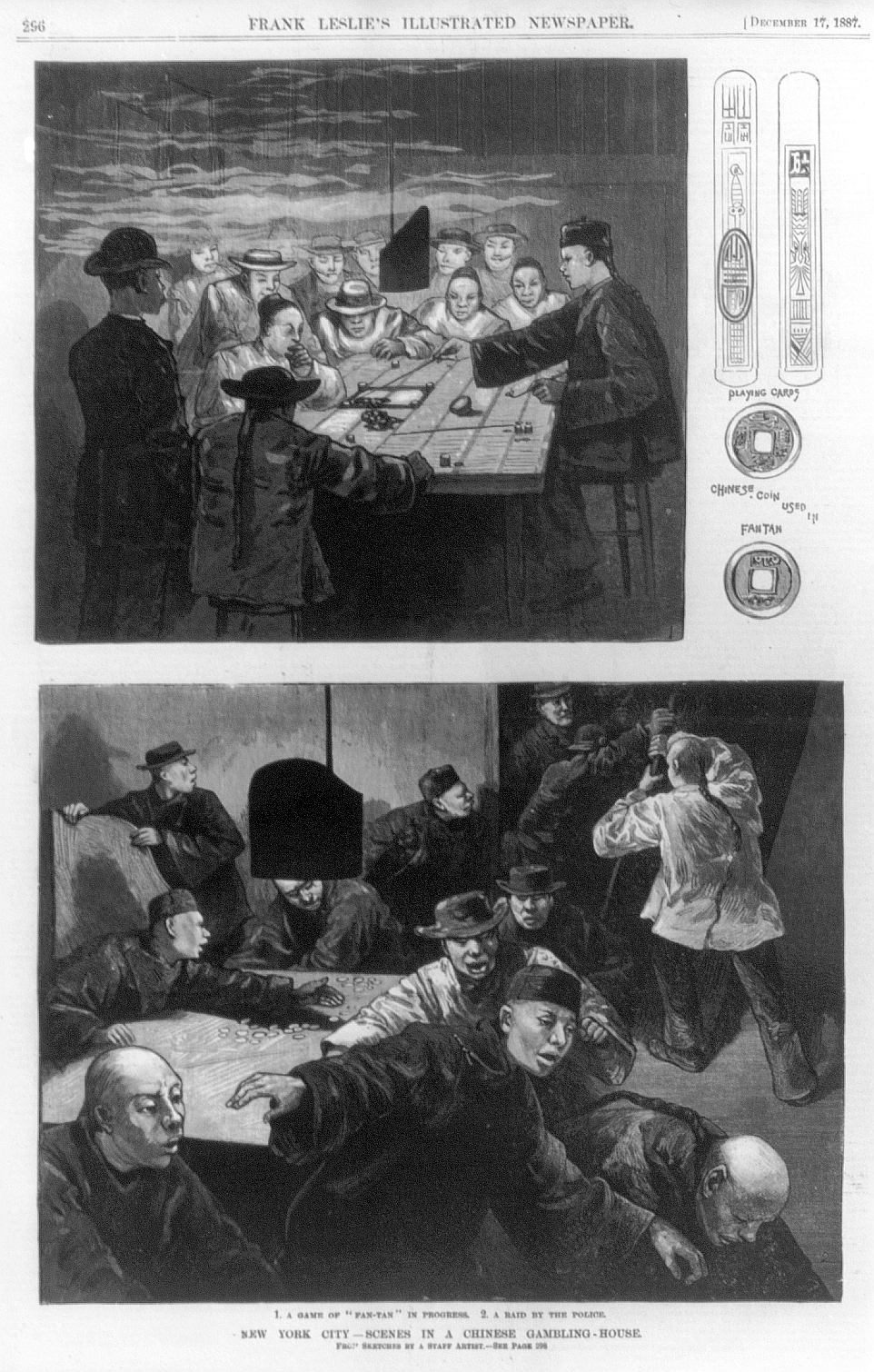
A page from Frank Leslie's Illustrated Newspaper depicting a fan-tan parlor in New York, a raid by the police, and cards and coins used in fan-tan, in December 1887.

The game may have arisen during third and fourth centuries, during the period of the Northern and Southern dynasties. It then spread through southern China during the Qing dynasty. The name fantan dates back only to the mid-nineteenth century. Before that time, fantan was known as 掩錢; yǎnqián; 'covering coins', 攤戲; tānxì, 攤錢; tānqián, or 意錢; yìqián. It was prominent during the Late Qing and Republican period in Canton and the Pearl River Delta region. The game was also played in the Philippines under the name Capona.

After 1850, fantan spread overseas as a side effect of the massive Cantonese emigration. As a rule, in places where a significant number of Cantonese migrants could be found, fantan was also present. Fan-tan was very popular among Chinese migrants in America, as most of them were of Cantonese origin. Jacob Riis, in his famous book about the underbelly of New York, How the Other Half Lives (1890), wrote of entering a Chinatown fan-tan parlor: "At the first foot-fall of leather soles on the steps the hum of talk ceases, and the group of celestials, crouching over their game of fan tan, stop playing and watch the comer with ugly looks. Fan tan is their ruling passion." The large Chinatown in San Francisco was also home to dozens of fan-tan houses in the 19th century. The city's former police commissioner Jesse B. Cook wrote that in 1889 Chinatown had 50 fan-tan games, and that "in the 50 fan tan gambling houses the tables numbered from one to 24, according to the size of the room."

California amended Section 330 of the California Penal Code in 1885, adding fan-tan to its list of banned games; this coincided with the general rise of anti-Chinese sentiment in the United States, as fan-tan was considered a differentiating vice on par with opium use and the direct cause of property crime and violence. Raids on fan-tan parlors were regularly featured in contemporary news articles, with police in some cases posing as Chinese to infiltrate the games. In San Jose, California, a typo in a local printed law led to charges being dismissed against several bettors. Despite its illegality, it was estimated that 100 fan-tan parlors were operating in San Francisco's Chinatown around the turn of the 20th century.

Because of the police raids, fan-tan parlors adopted double-entrance security measures: after entering through the street doors, a bettor would have to pass through a hallway and a second interior set of doors. If the guard posted on the exterior doors did not recognize the prospective bettor or the guard raised an alarm in the event of a raid, the interior doors, often heavily reinforced with iron, would be shut and barred, giving the fan-tan patrons and parlor time to dismantle the game, conceal evidence, and flee the premises.

Fan-tan is no longer as popular as it once was, having been replaced by modern casino games like Baccarat, and other traditional Chinese games such as Mah Jong and Pai Gow. Fan-tan is still played at some Macau casinos.

== The game ==
The game is operated by two people: the "tán kún" or croupier, who stands by the table at position no. 1, and the "ho kún" (clerk or cashier), who stands to the left of the "tán kún".

A square is marked in the center of an ordinary table, or a square piece of metal is laid on it, the sides being marked 1, 2, 3 and 4 in anti-clockwise order; alternatively, the sides may be marked 0 through 3, with 0 taking the place of 4. The banker puts on the table a double handful of small objects (buttons, beads, coins, dried beans, or similar articles), which he covers with a metal bowl. When all bets are placed, the bowl is removed and the "tán kún" uses a small bamboo stick to remove the objects from the heap, four at a time, until the final batch is reached.

If the final batch contains four objects, those who wagered on position 4 (and specific bets that include position 4) win; if three, the backers of No. 3 win; if two, the backers of No. 2 win and if one the backers of No. 1 win. A variant substitutes dice instead of counting the objects by fours; the remainder after dividing the sum of the dice by four is used to determine the winning positions.

=== Betting ===
Fan-Tan uses a fixed-odds betting system where all winning wagers are paid according to the true odds of success. The pool of money used to pay off bets is the total amount wagered on all positions, less a house commission, which ranges from 5% to 25% depending on the time and place. Because the prizes are paid entirely out of the wagers, the game is relatively inexpensive to operate.

Culin (1891) describes four potential bets:

1. "Fan", in which the wager is on a single position to win.
2. "Hong", in which the wager is on three positions, one of which (the primary bet) is selected to win; if either of the other two positions (the two secondary bets) are selected, the bettor does not lose, but it is considered a push and the bettor's money is returned.
3. "Kwok", in which the wager is on two positions (two primary bets); if either is selected, the bettor wins.
4. "Nim", in which the wager is again on two positions, one of which is selected to win (one primary bet), and the other (one secondary bet) is selected to push.

A square diagram showing the different combinations of positions that may be bet in the gambling game Fan-Tan.
Wager	Odds (Note: True odds of occurrence)	Payout (Note: Net payout, meaning the amount returned in addition to the original wager. This is the payout before the house commission is calculated. For a typical house commission of 5%, the actual payout is 95% of the value shown, e.g., for the 3:1 payout of the "Fan" bet, the actual payout would be 2.85:1.)	Nomenclature (Note: As displayed in the diagram; the larger number(s) indicate the primary position(s) wagered, and the smaller subscript number(s) indicate the secondary position(s) wagered.)	Notes
番 (Note: 買番; mǎi fān; maai5 faan1; 'Buying a single number') "Fan"	1:4	3:1	1; 2 4; 3	The player wagers money on a single primary position with a narrow red card (kau li) beneath the money. The player wins four times the amount bet, based on the true odds of having the remainder match the position wagered.
紅 (Note: 買紅; mǎi hóng; maai5 hung4; 'Buying a row') "Hong"	1:4 (Note: For the primary wagered position(s), denoted by the larger number(s).)	1:1	_{2}1_{4} _{1}2_{3} _{1}4_{3} _{2}3_{4}	The player wagers money on a single primary position without the red card. The player receives money if the remainder is one of three numbers: the player wins two times the amount bet if the remainder matches the primary wagered position, and wins an amount equal to the wager (i.e., a push: money is returned without loss) if the remainder is one of the secondary positions to either side of the primary wagered position.
紅 "Hong"	1:2 (Note: For the secondary wagered position(s), denoted by the smaller number(s).)	0:1 (Note: The secondary bet(s) pay off as a "push": the bettor's original wager is returned.)	_{2}1_{4} _{1}2_{3} _{1}4_{3} _{2}3_{4}	The player wagers money on a single primary position without the red card. The player receives money if the remainder is one of three numbers: the player wins two times the amount bet if the remainder matches the primary wagered position, and wins an amount equal to the wager (i.e., a push: money is returned without loss) if the remainder is one of the secondary positions to either side of the primary wagered position.
角 (Note: 買角; mǎi jiǎo; maai5 gok3; 'Buying the corner'; can be romanized as "Kwok" or "Kok") "Kwok"	1:2	1:1	1-2 1-4; 1-3; 2-4; 2-3 3-4	The player wagers money on a corner between two adjacent positions, and wins two times the amount bet if the remainder is either of the two primary positions adjacent to the wagered corner. In the modern variants, it is possible to buy both odd positions (i.e., positions 1 and 3) and/or both even positions (2 and 4), even though these are not adjacent.
念 (Note: 買念; mǎi niàn; maai5 nim6; 'Buying the twist') "Nim"	1:4	2:1	1_{2} 1_{3} 1_{4} 2_{1} 4_{1} 2_{4} 4_{2} 2_{3} 4_{3} 3_{2} 3_{1} 3_{4}	The player places the wager at the side of a single primary position with the red card on top of the money. The player wins double the amount wagered if the remainder matches the primary position, or wins an amount equal to the wager if the remainder is the secondary position adjacent to the side of the wagered primary position. In the modern variants, this has expanded to include buying the opposite position (i.e., if position 1 is the primary bet, the twist or side bet could be on position 2, 3, or 4).
念 "Nim"	1:4	0:1	1_{2} 1_{3} 1_{4} 2_{1} 4_{1} 2_{4} 4_{2} 2_{3} 4_{3} 3_{2} 3_{1} 3_{4}	

In the modern game, the "Hong" (row) bet is usually replaced by two alternative three-number bets. The first of these is the "Tan" or "Nga Tan" bet (丫攤; yā tān; ngaa1 taan1; 'booth'). Two positions are chosen as the primary wager, and one position is chosen as the secondary "push" wager; there are twelve possible combinations of this type of bet, and each position has six corresponding primary and three secondary wagers. For example, the six bets that include position 1 as the primary wager are 1-2_{4}, 1-2_{3}, 1-3_{2}; 1-4_{2}, 1-4_{3}, and 1-3_{4}; and the three bets that include position 1 as the secondary "push" wager are 2-4_{1}, 2-3_{1}, and 3-4_{1}, so any single position will result in a win for 6/12 of the "Tan" bets and a push for 3/12 of them.

The second three-number bet that can be made is an all-primary wager, known as "Sheh Sam Hong", sometimes romanized as "Shen Sam Hong" (三門; sān mén; saam1 mun4; 'three gates' or 射三紅; shè sān hóng; se6 saam1 hung4; 'shoot three row'), where any one of the three numbers will win. There are four combinations of the three numbers: 1-2-3, 2-3-4, 3-4-1, or 4-1-2, so any single position will result in a win for 3/4 of the "SSH" bets. The payout for the "Tan" and "SSH" bets is correspondingly lower, based on the increased odds of winning, and the two modern three-number bets also generally require a higher minimum stake because of the lower payout.

An octagonal diagram showing the modern combinations of positions that may be bet in the gambling game Fan-Tan.
Wager	Odds	Payout	Nomenclature	Notes
丫攤 (Note: 丫攤; yā tān; ngaa1 taan1; 'Booth'; can be abbreviated either as "Nga" or "Tan") "Tan"	1:2	1:2	/ 1‑2_{4} / 2‑4_{1} / 1‑4_{2}; 1‑2_{3} / / / / 1‑4_{3}; 1‑3_{2} / / / / 1‑3_{4}; 2‑3_{1} / / / / 3‑4_{1}; / 2‑3_{4} / 2‑4_{3} / 3‑4_{2}	Two primary positions will win, but at a lower payout; one secondary position will push. Higher minimum bet may be required.
丫攤 "Tan"	1:4	0:1	/ 1‑2_{4} / 2‑4_{1} / 1‑4_{2}; 1‑2_{3} / / / / 1‑4_{3}; 1‑3_{2} / / / / 1‑3_{4}; 2‑3_{1} / / / / 3‑4_{1}; / 2‑3_{4} / 2‑4_{3} / 3‑4_{2}	Two primary positions will win, but at a lower payout; one secondary position will push. Higher minimum bet may be required.
射三紅 (Note: 射三紅; shè sān hóng; se6 saam1 hung4; 'Shoot three row') "SSH"	3:4	1:3	/ 4‑1‑2; 1‑2‑3 / / 3‑4‑1; / 2‑3‑4	Any of the three primary positions in the wager will win, but at a lower payout. Higher minimum bet may be required.

Notes

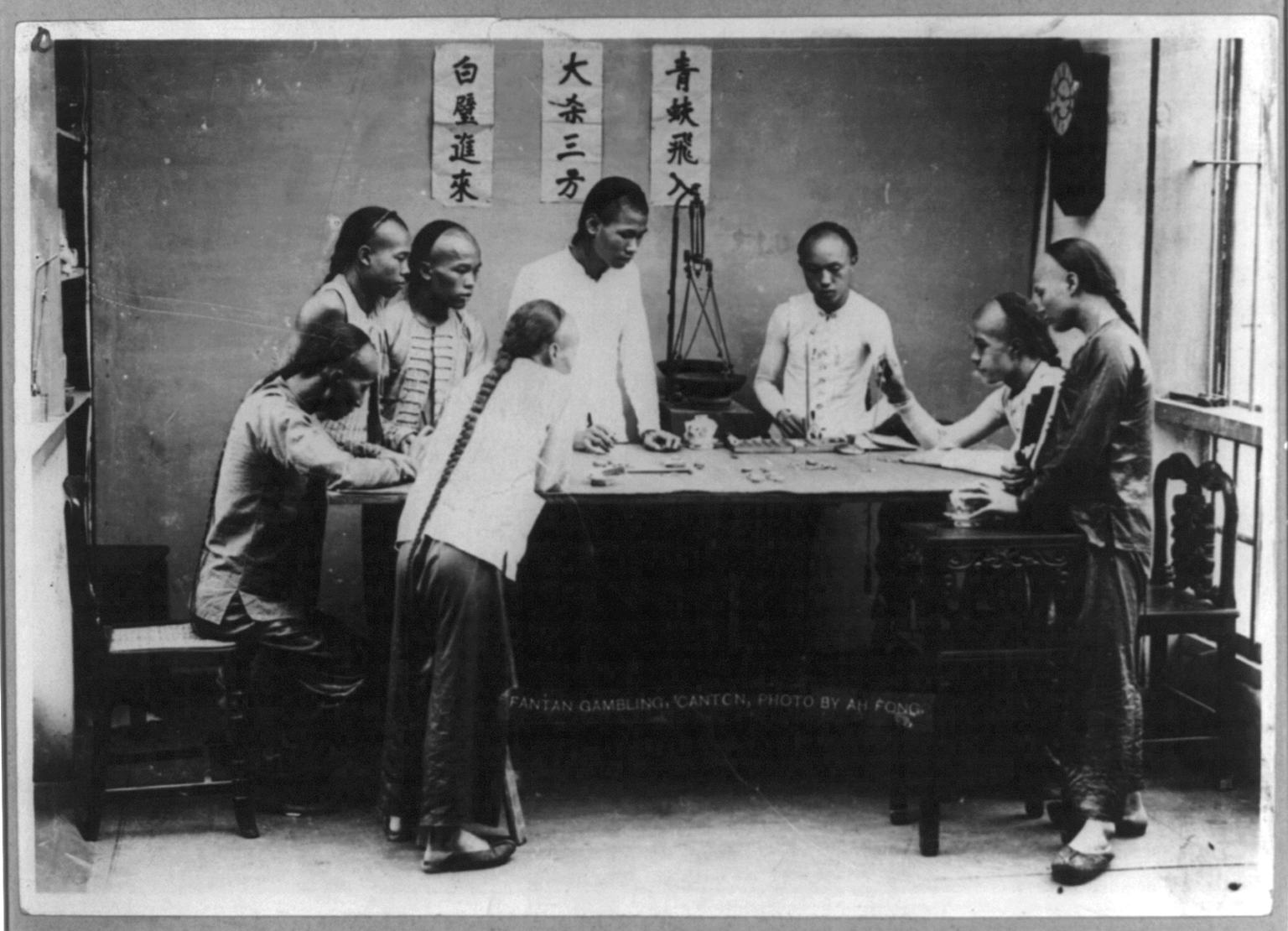
Studio photo of a fan-tan game in Canton, China, by Lai Afong

Currently, in Macau casinos, the house commission is uniformly set at 5%. For example, assume that bettors have wagered a total of $100 on each position as "Fan" bets, meaning the total of all wagers is $400 for all positions; the true odds of winning this specific wager are 1 in 4. The total payout to the bettors who chose the winning position would be $400 (the total wagered on all positions). Based on the amount wagered on the winning position, $100, the net payout is 3 to 1: $100 wagered, $300 returned in addition to the original wager. However, the house commission of 5% means the winning bettor(s) are paid a total of $285 ($300 less 5%), providing a total commission of $15 to the house for the game.

=== Odds and payout ===
True odds, payout, and return of Fan-Tan bets
Bet Type	Potential Bets	True odds			Net payout (w/ 5% to house)	Net return
Bet Type	Potential Bets	Win	Push	Lose	Net payout (w/ 5% to house)	Net return
番 Fan	4	1/4	0/4	3/4	3:1 (2.85:1)	-0.0375
紅 Hong	4	1/4	2/4	1/4	1:1 (0.95:1)	-0.0125
角 Kwok	6	3/6	0/6	3/6	1:1 (0.95:1)	-0.0250
念 Nim	12	3/12	3/12	6/12	2:1 (1.90:1)	-0.0250
丫攤 Tan	12	6/12	3/12	3/12	1:2 (0.95:2)	-0.0125
射三紅 SSH	4	3/4	0/4	1/4	1:3 (0.95:3)	-0.0125

The net payout for each bet is determined by the true odds. The odds of winning for each type of bet is determined by considering the total number of potential bets within that type, and if how many of those bets will win, lose, or push for a given position outcome; the sum of the odds for any single bet (win + lose + push) is always one. The net payout for each bet is calculated as (Losing odds)/(Winning odds), less the cut for the house. The odds of the "push" or secondary positions only affect the calculation of net payout by reducing the number of losing bets because when the result is a push, the original wager is returned without loss.

For example, the "Fan" bet on a single position only wins 1/4 of the time, i.e., only when that specific position is selected; consequently, there is a 3/4 chance of losing the "Fan" wager. The net payout is (3/4)/(1/4) = 3, before the cut for the house is taken. Assuming a 5% cut, the final payout for a "Fan" win is 95% of 3×, or 2.85× the amount bet. Similarly, the odds of winning a "Tan" bet are 6/12 and the odds of losing a "Tan" bet are 3/12 (a push will occur for the remaining 3/12), so the net payout is (3/12)/(6/12) = 1/2, before the cut for the house is taken.

The net return is the product of the odds of winning and final payout (after the cut for the house is taken), less the odds of losing. Again, the odds of a push are not considered. For example, for the "Fan" bet, the net return is $\frac{1}{4}\cdot{2.85}-\frac{3}{4}=-0.0375$, meaning the house receives 3.75% of each "Fan" bet, on average. In contrast, for the "Tan" bet, the net return is $\frac{6}{12}\cdot{\frac{0.95}{2}}-\frac{3}{12}=-0.0125$, and the house receives 1.25% of each "Tan" bet.

=== Equipment ===
- Numerous small objects (typically copper cash, beads, buttons, or beans)
- Tan ching (playing mat)
- Tan koi (cup or cover)
- Tan pong (stick or rod used to remove objects)

== Cultural references ==
Fan Tan Alley in the Chinatown of Victoria, British Columbia is named for the numerous gaming parlors that once lined it. It is the narrowest street in North America, at just 90 centimetres (35 in) wide
