= Golden Earrings =

1947 romantic spy film directed by Mitchell Leisen

- Directed by: Mitchell Leisen
- Written by: Frank Butler; Helen Deutsch; Abraham Polonsky
- Based on: Golden Earrings by Jolán Földes
- Produced by: Harry Tugend
- Starring: Ray Milland; Marlene Dietrich
- Cinematography: Daniel L. Fapp
- Edited by: Alma Macrorie
- Music by: Victor Young
- Distributed by: Paramount Pictures
- Release date: August 27, 1947
- Running time: 95 minutes
- Country: United States
- Language: English
- Box office: $2,950,000 (US rentals)

Golden Earrings is a 1947 American romantic spy film made by Paramount Pictures and starring Ray Milland and Marlene Dietrich. It was directed by Mitchell Leisen and produced by Harry Tugend from a screenplay by Frank Butler, Helen Deutsch and Abraham Polonsky, based on a novel by Jolán Földes. Unlike the novel, the film has a happy ending, with Lydia and the officer reuniting after the war. The music score was by Victor Young and the cinematography by Daniel L. Fapp.

The film's song, "Golden Earrings", with a tune by Victor Young and lyrics by Ray Evans and Jay Livingston, was sung in the movie by Murvyn Vye. It was a hit recording in 1947–48 by Peggy Lee.

One film location was in the Metolius River area in July 1946 with approximately 30 extras from Bend, Oregon.

== Plot ==
Starting in London, England in 1946 after World War II had been declared over, two items are delivered to a hotel: a small package for a retired British Major General Ralph Denistoun, and a telegram for an American named Quentin Reynolds. The bellhop drops the telegram off to Quentin Reynolds first and he then takes the small package across the room to Ralph Denistoun. When Ralph sees the box's point of origin, he opens the package revealing a pair of golden earrings, holding one up to his pierced ear while looking at his reflection in a window. Denistoun later boards a plane from London to Paris, finding himself seated next to Reynolds, who asks Denistoun why he has kept the reason for his pierced ears a secret for so long. Denistoun then tells him the story.

Before the war had officially broken out, he and another man named Richard Byrd were already in Germany, being held captive by a man named Hoff. They plotted to escape, planning to meet at the home of a friend of Byrd's father, Professor Otto Krosigk, who had developed a special poison gas formula. Splitting up with Byrd after their escape, Denistoun came across a gypsy lady named Lydia who helped him get across country with her horse and wagon by dressing him up as a gypsy to disguise him from the Nazis. Reaching the city where Denistoun was to regroup with Byrd, they find that Byrd has been captured by the Germans while trying to reach Professor Krosigk on his own.

As Hoff and two of his men tried using a flame to make Byrd talk, Denistoun revealed himself and shot all three of the Nazis. Byrd, already near death, died. Lydia and another gypsy named Zoltan helped him get rid of the bodies and get to Professor Krosigk's home. The professor did not believe Denistoun initially, but a visit from some German soldiers convinced him of Denistoun's authenticity. He then gave Denistoun the gas formula, written on a bill of German cash. Denistoun was then able to leave without the Germans discovering his identity.

Lydia then led him to a point on the High Rhine where he could swim across to Switzerland with the formula in a special container. Ralph had removed his earrings and coat, giving them back to Lydia before plunging into the river.

After Denistoun reaches Paris, he visits the very place where he remembered leaving Lydia several years ago, spotting her horse, Apple, and her wagon across the river. Putting the earrings back on, Denistoun spits three times in the river, per gypsy tradition, before crossing the river. On the other side, he calls out to Lydia, who is excited to see him. The two then get into the wagon, Lydia puts the coat back on him and the two ride off.

== Cast ==
- Ray Milland as Ralph Denistoun
- Marlene Dietrich as Lydia
- Murvyn Vye as Zoltan
- Bruce Lester as Richard Byrd
- Dennis Hoey as Hoff
- Quentin Reynolds as himself
- Reinhold Schünzel as Prof. Otto Krosigk
- Ivan Triesault as Maj. Reimann
- Hermine Sterler as Greta Krosigk

== Production ==
This was Marlene Dietrich's first American film after concluding her years of work during World War II supporting the war effort. Filming started while she was still in France. “Meanwhile, Dietrich was researching gypsy life in the camps along the Seine. When she got to the set, she brought an authentic costume with her and insisted on playing the role barefoot.” TCM's article on the film describes in detail the way she behaved toward Ray Milland, whom she did not want in the film and who was billed over her. Regardless of what went on during the filming, the picture was a hit with audiences, returning its costs seven-fold and fulfilling Milland's fear that Dietrich would “steal” the picture.

According to TCM, although Polonsky received screen credit, none of his writing was included in the final film.
