= Parliament Street, Exeter =

Street in England

Coordinates: 50.72304°N 3.53230°W

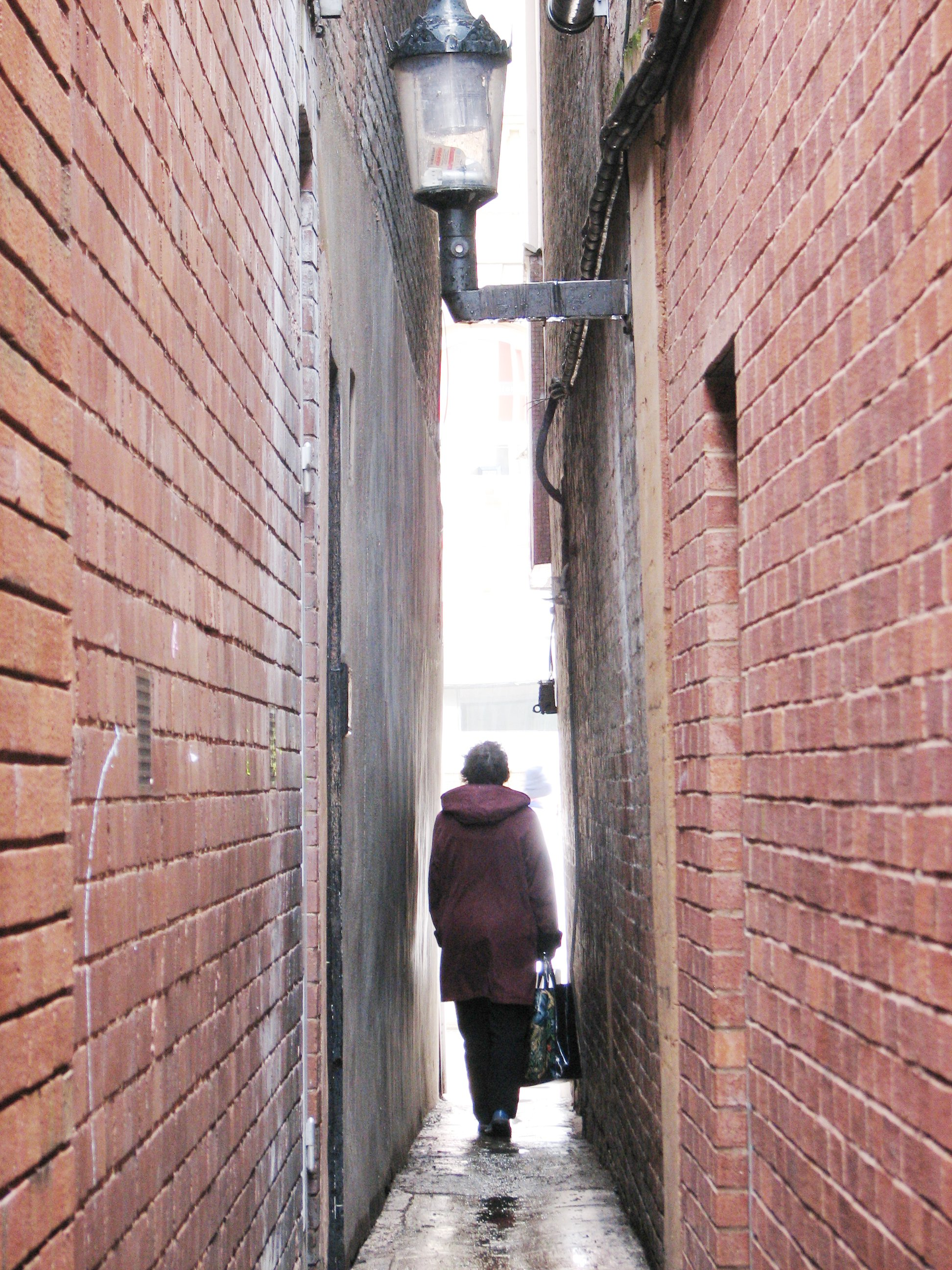
Two people cannot easily pass in Parliament Street.

Parliament Street is a 50-metre (160 ft)-long street in the city Exeter, Devon, England. It links High Street to Waterbeer Street and dates from the 14th century. About 0.64 metres (2 ft 1 in) at its narrowest and approximately 1.22 metres (4 ft 0 in) at its widest, it has been claimed to be the world's narrowest street, but this title officially belongs to the Spreuerhofstraße in Reutlingen, Germany.

Formerly called Small Lane, it was renamed when Parliament was derided by the city council for passing the 1832 Reform Bill. It was called Parliament Alley, immediately after the name change from Small Lane. The authorities and some citizens thought an alley was "too common", so it was changed to Parliament Street circa 1850. Today it attracts tourists, many of whom have no idea that it is only an alleyway. In 1836 residents of nearby Waterbeer Street subscribed £130 to have Parliament Street widened, but this was not implemented.

== See also ==
- L'Androuno, 29 centimetres (11.4 in): A narrow street in France
- Fan Tan Alley, 90 centimetres (35.4 in): A narrow street in Canada
- Mårten Trotzigs Gränd, 90 centimetres (35.4 in): A narrow street in Sweden
- Strada Sforii, 111 centimetres (43.7 in): A narrow street in Romania
- Spreuerhofstraße, 31 centimetres (12.2 in): A narrow street in Germany
- Qianshi hutong, 70 centimetres (27.6 in): The narrowest hutong in Beijing
