= Jolán Földes =

Hungarian author

Jolán Földes (Yolanda Foldes or Yolanda Clarent) (20 December 1902, Kenderes – October 1963, London) was a Hungarian author. Her most famous novel is the Street of the Fishing Cat.

== Biography ==
Jolán Földes graduated in Budapest (1921) and went to Paris, where she was employed as a worker and clerk. Her first novel, Mária jól érett (1932), was a literary success in Hungary and awarded with Mikszáth Prize.

Her comedy Majd a Vica (1935), written together with Pál Vajda, was presented by the prestigious Újszínház (New Theater) in Budapest.

Her novel A halászó macska uccája (The Street of the Fishing Cat) tells the difficult life of a family of working class Hungarian emigrants in Paris after World War I. It won the 1936 All-nations Prize Novel Competition of the Pinter Publishing Ltd (London). The title refers to the name of the narrowest street in Paris, Rue du Chat-qui-Pêche. The novel was translated into 12 European languages.

Among her books are Prelude to Love, Shadows on the Mirror and Férjhez megyek (I'm Getting Married, 1935), Ági nem emlékszik semmire (1933), Péter nem veszti el a fejét (1937), Fej vagy írás (1937), Más világrész (1937).

In 1941, Földes emigrated to London and her later works were written in English.

Interlude, first published in England under the title Heads or Tails (originally Fej vagy írás), is set in Egypt at the time of the Spanish Revolution.

Golden Earrings was made into a film of the same name in 1947, starring Marlene Dietrich and Ray Milland. The novel, originally written in English, was translated to Hungarian in 1946 under the title Arany fülbevaló.

Földes was a popular author of the interwar era. Her novels are entertaining but she is considered a light-weight author by literary critics. Only The Street of the Fishing Cat is appreciated as an important literary achievement. The novel was republished in Hungary in 1989.
