= Fan Tan Alley =

Alley in Victoria, British Columbia, Canada

Coordinates: 48.4290°N 123.3679°W

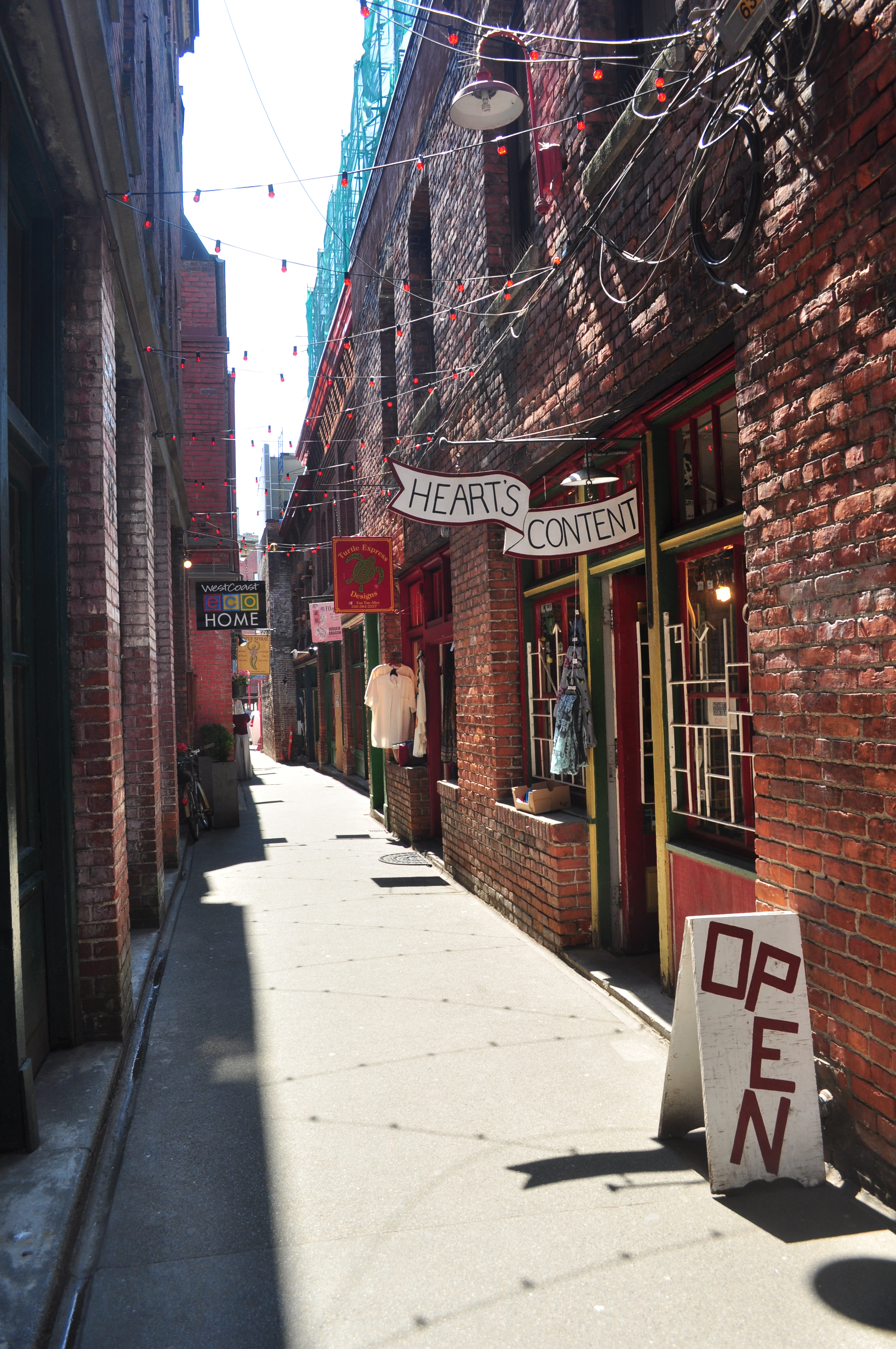
- Looking south on Fan Tan Alley

Route information
- Length: .045 mi (72 m)

Major junctions
- South end: Pandora Avenue
- North end: Fisgard Avenue

Location
- Country: Canada
- Province: British Columbia
- Regional districts: Capital

Highway system
- British Columbia provincial highways

Fan Tan Alley is an alley in the Chinatown neighbourhood of Victoria, British Columbia, Canada that is known for being the narrowest commercial street in North America, being less than 0.9 m (3.0 ft) wide at its narrowest point. It runs south from Fisgard Street to Pandora Avenue at the block between Government Street and Store Street. Named after the Chinese gambling game Fan-Tan, the alley was originally well known for opium factories that produced opium until it was made illegal in 1908.

The alley became known for gambling and got its Fan Tan name from the board game of the same name during the 1910s. Police raids on the illegal gambling clubs and declining visitors led to the closure of the gambling clubs in the 1950s and 60s. Fan Tan alley fell into disrepair and buildings were condemned at the time but was later revitalized in the 1970s and 80s with leadership from David Chuenyan Lai. Today the alley is a tourist destination containing many small shops, an art gallery, restaurants, apartments, and offices. It was designated as a heritage property by the local government in 2001.

In 2006, material salvaged from the alley's original gate was donated to the Six String Nation project, and now serves as kerfing on a guitar located there.

In the 1990 movie Bird on a Wire, Mel Gibson rides a motorcycle down the alley.

== See also ==
- L'Androuno: A narrow street in France
- Mårten Trotzigs Gränd: A narrow street in Sweden
- Parliament Street, Exeter: A narrow street in the United Kingdom
- Spreuerhofstraße: A narrow street in Germany
- Strada sforii: A narrow street in Romania
