= Rue de la Huchette =

Street in Paris, France

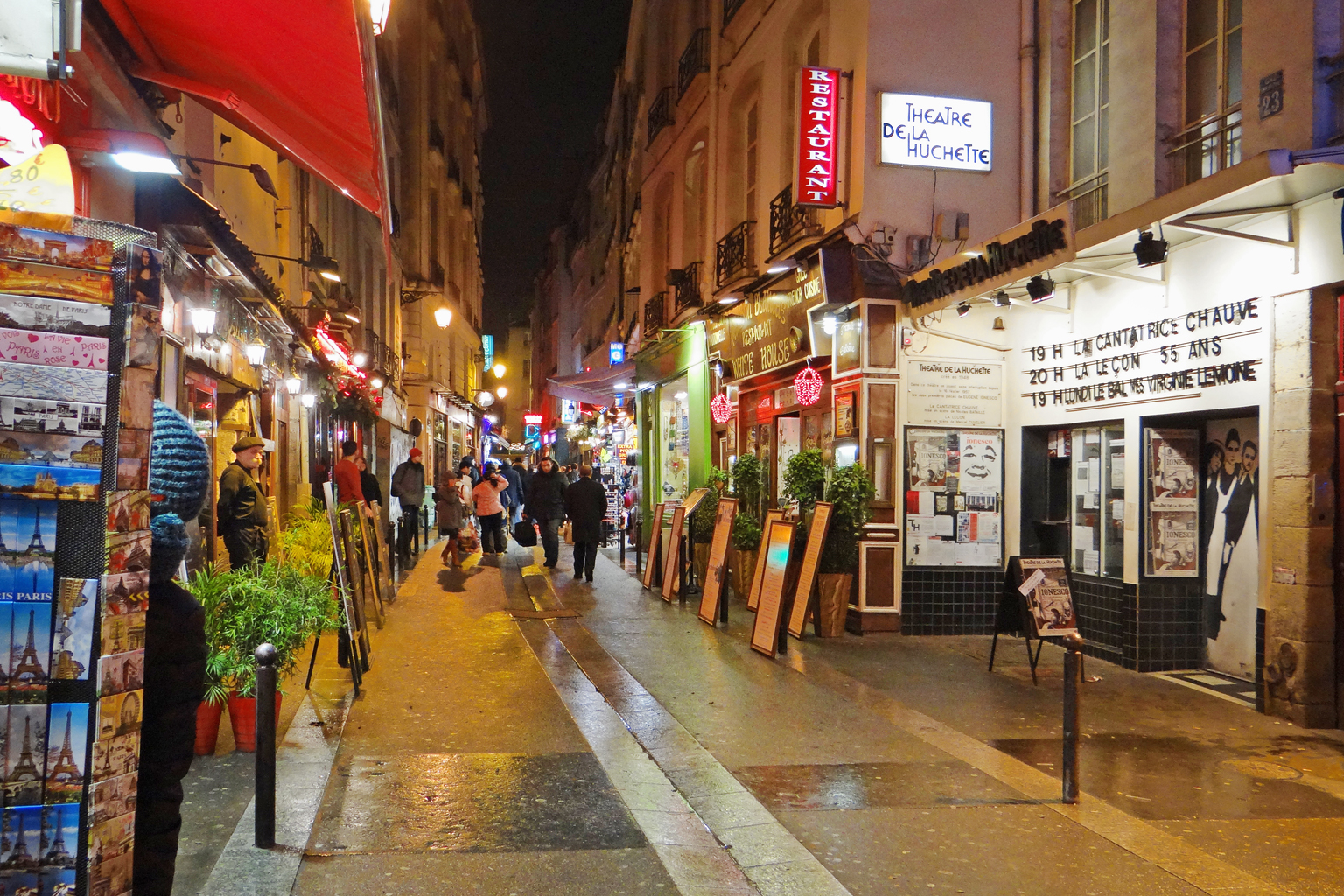

- Location within Paris
- Length: 164 m (179 yd; 538 ft 1 in)
- Width: 10 m (32 ft 10 in)
- Arrondissement: 5th
- Quarter: Sorbonne
- Coordinates: 48°51′11″N 2°20′43″E
- From: 4 rue du Petit Pont and 6 place du Petit Pont
- To: 3 place Saint-Michel

Construction
- Completed: c. 1200; 826 years ago
- Denomination: c. 1284; 742 years ago

The Rue de la Huchette (French pronunciation: [ʁy də la yʃɛt]) is one of the oldest streets running along the Rive Gauche in Paris, France. Running eastward just below the Seine river from the Place Saint-Michel, it is today an animated Latin Quarter artery with one of the highest concentrations of restaurants in the city, Greek specialties predominating. It is situated between the Boulevard Saint-Michel and the Rue du Petit-Pont and faces the cathedral of Notre-Dame de Paris. This almost exclusively pedestrian street is very popular with tourists. Disdained by some guidebooks as "Bacteria Alley", the street nevertheless has an intense night life with no fewer than four pubs and several bars.

The street is celebrated by the American writer Elliot Paul, who lived there in the 1920s and 30s, in The Last Time I Saw Paris (1942).

== History ==
The Rue de la Huchette existed as early as 1200 as the Rue de Laas, a road running adjacent to a walled vineyard property known then as the Clos du Laas. The property was sold and divided for urban development in the early 13th century, grew many noble properties in the centuries following, but from the 17th century, the Rue de la Huchette was known mostly for its taverns and rotisseries ("meat-roasters").

The inhabitants of the Rue de la Huchette in the period leading up to the Second World War are portrayed in Elliot Paul's book The Last Time I Saw Paris, called A Narrow Street in the British edition (1942). The period after the Second World War is covered in Paul's book Springtime in Paris (1950).

== Origin of the name ==
From around 1284, the name of a house on the street belonging to the Notre-Dame chapter — À la Huchette d'Or — took the place of the former Rue de Laas appellation. The obscure word "huchette" may derive from "hutchet", an old term for a bugle.

== Notable buildings ==
=== Odd numbers ===
- No. 5: Le Caveau de la Huchette, a 16th-century building, formerly a hotel (where Elliot Paul lived in the 1920s and 1930s); since 1946, one of Paris's most famous jazz clubs.
- No. 13: Building whose ground floor was an office where, from 1684, apothicaires (pharmacists), could find or hire a nurse/medical help.
- No. 17: Building's corner with the Rue Xavier Privas, with original engraving on the stone.
- No. 21: Building dating from 1650.
- No. 23: Théâtre de la Huchette.

=== Even numbers ===
- No. 4: Building dating from 1729; its former sign "À la Hure d'Or" ("of the Golden Head") is still visible on its façade.
- No. 8: Building dating from 1494.
- No. 10: Former site of the Cadran bleu, a modest furnished lodging house where Napoleon Bonaparte stayed from June to August 1795.
- No. 14: Site of a shop of a 15th-century needlemaker. Although the building dates from a later time, the "Y" signaling the shopowner's trade is still visible in a marble oval above the ground-floor façade. Also visible engraved into the stone at the building's corner with the Rue du Chat-qui-Pêche is the street's name and former arrondissement number.
- No. 16: Building dating from the 18th century.

== Other attractions ==
The street is known for its collection of Greek restaurants. The maitre d's of these establishments often shatter cheap plates on the street in front of their doors to attract attention and entice tourists inside.

== Closest transport ==
- Métro line 4, Saint-Michel
- Métro line 10, Cluny - la Sorbonne
- RER C, Saint-Michel - Notre-Dame
