= Spreuerhofstraße =

Narrowest street in the world, in Reutlingen, Germany

Coordinates: 48.4908°N 9.2157°E

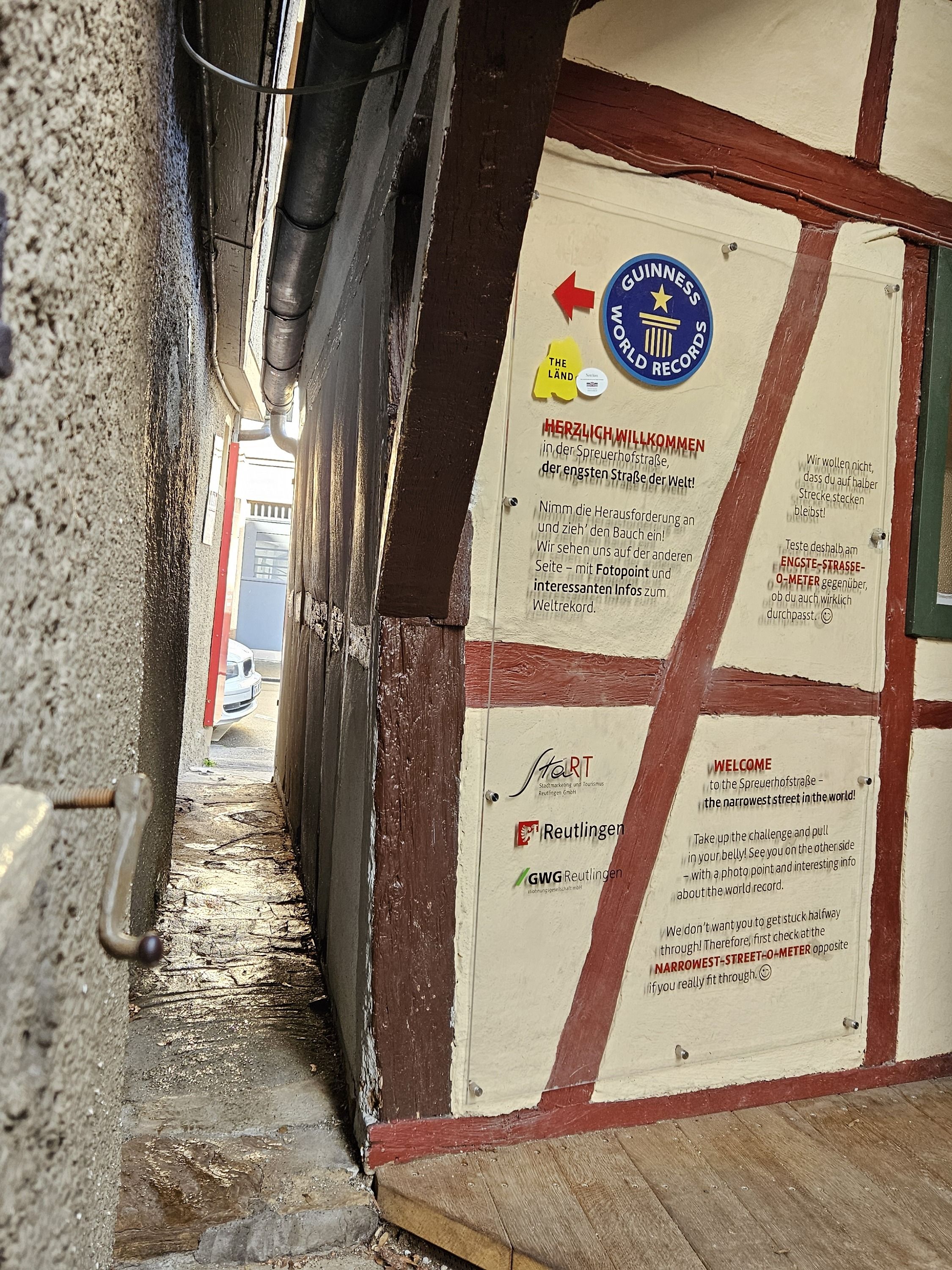
A view of the street including the world record sign in 2023

A view of the Spreuerhofstrasse's story at the exit in 2026

Supposed entrance of Spreuerhofstrasse in 2026

A view of the Spreuerhofstrasse's exit in 2026

Spreuerhofstraße is, according to Guinness World Records, the world's narrowest street, found in the city of Reutlingen, Germany. It ranges from 31 centimetres (12.2 in) at its narrowest to 50 centimetres (19.7 in) at its widest and has a length of 380 centimetres (149.6 in). The lane was built in 1727 during the reconstruction efforts after the area was destroyed in the massive citywide fire of 1726 and is officially listed in the Land-Registry Office as City Street Number 77.
