= Palace Cigar Store =

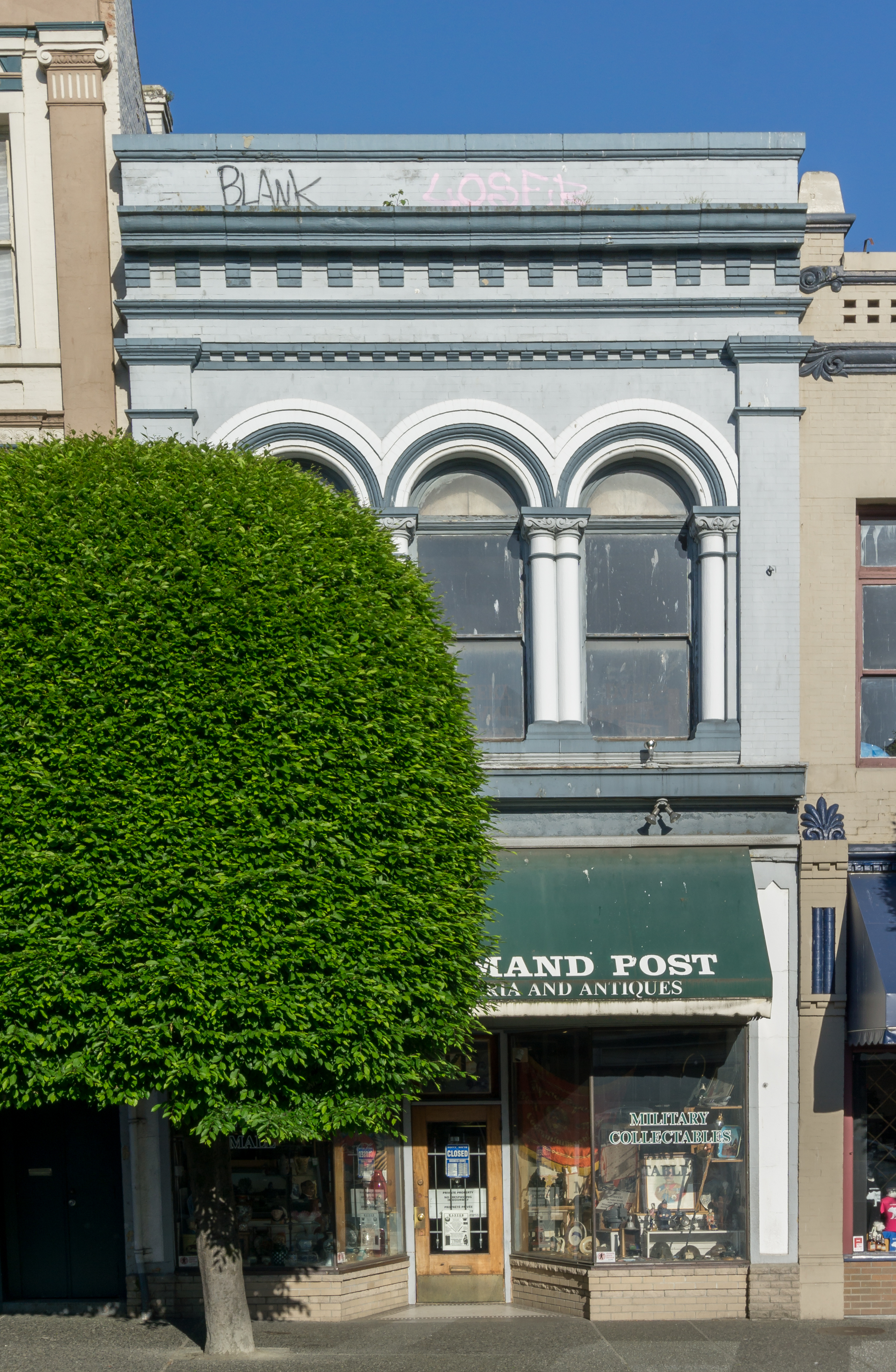
- The building's exterior in 2018
- Interactive map of the Palace Cigar Store area

General information
- Type: Commercial purposes
- Architectural style: Romanesque Revival
- Location: 1306 Government St, Victoria, British Columbia, Canada
- Coordinates: 48.4269°N 123.3676°W
- Completed: 1902

Height
- Height: 15 m (49 ft)

Technical details
- Floor count: 2

The Palace Cigar Store is an historic two-floor brick building at 1306 Government Street in Victoria, British Columbia, Canada. Completed in 1902, the building was added to the Canadian Register of Historic Places in 1995. It is part of Victoria's old town within a cluster of turn of the century buildings in the commercial district. The building is also significant for being an example of the transition from the Late Victorian era to the Edwardian era during a period when architectural styles and building technologies were in transition. The lower store-front level serves as retail with the upper level used for office space. The building is designated Palace Cigar Store after its first occupant.

== See also ==
- List of historic places in Victoria, British Columbia
