= HMS Champion (1915) =

Royal Navy C-class light cruiser

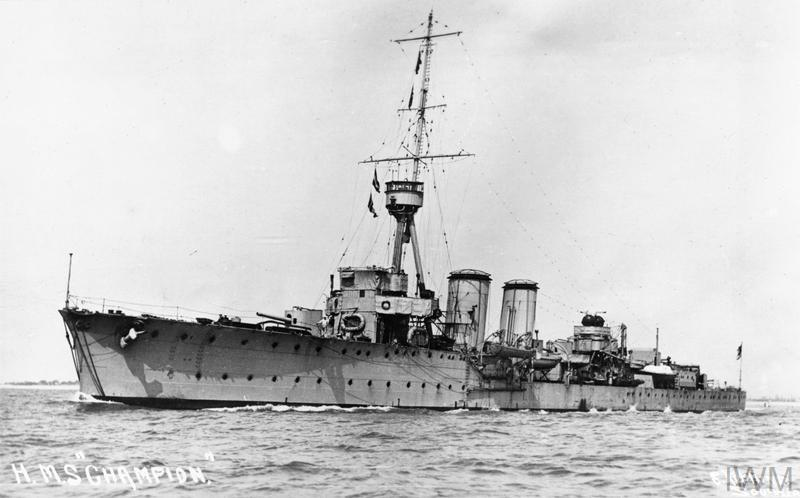
- Champion during World War I

History

United Kingdom
- Name: Champion
- Builder: Hawthorn Leslie and Company
- Laid down: 9 March 1914
- Launched: 29 May 1915
- Completed: December 1915
- Commissioned: 20 December 1915
- Decommissioned: October 1924
- Recommissioned: May 1925
- Decommissioned: December 1933
- Identification: Pennant number: C8 (1914); 37 (Jan 18); 25 (Apr 18); P.00 (Nov 19)
- Fate: Sold for scrap, 28 July 1934

General characteristics
- Class & type: C-class light cruiser
- Displacement: 3,750 long tons (3,810 t)
- Length: 446 ft (136 m)
- Beam: 41.5 ft (12.6 m)
- Draught: 14.5 ft (4.4 m)
- Installed power: 8 Yarrow boilers; 40,000 shp (30,000 kW)
- Propulsion: 2 shafts; 2 geared steam turbines
- Speed: 28.5 knots (52.8 km/h; 32.8 mph)
- Complement: 324
- Armament: 4 × single 6 in (152 mm) guns; 1 × single 4 in (102 mm) AA gun; 1 × single 3 pdr (47 mm (1.9 in)) gun; 6 × 21 in (533 mm) torpedo tubes
- Armour: 4 inch side (amidships); 2¼-1½ inch side (bows); 2½ - 2 inch side (stern); 1 inch upper decks (amidships); 1 inch deck over rudder

HMS Champion was a C-class light cruiser of the Royal Navy that saw service during World War I. She was part of the Calliope group of the C class.

== Construction ==
Eight light cruisers were ordered for the Royal Navy in the 1913 budget. The six ships of the Caroline class used conventional direct-drive steam turbines but two, Champion and Calliope, had experimental engine designs using geared reduction to match optimum working speeds of turbines and propellers. This followed experimental designs ordered in 1911 using geared high-pressure turbines for the destroyers Badger and Beaver and in 1912 using gearing for both high-pressure and low-pressure turbines in the destroyers Leonidas and Lucifer. Champion and Calliope tested different designs.

Built by Hawthorn Leslie and Company at Tyneside, England, Champion was laid down on 9 March 1914, launched on 29 May 1915, and completed in December 1915.

Champion had two propeller shafts, the port one being driven from the sternmost engine room and the starboard one from forward. Gearing increased overall engine efficiency, allowing a reduction in boiler and turbine size for a given force provided by the propellers, so the initial design reduced the boiler room size and dropped the nominal developed power from 40,000 shaft horsepower (shp) (29.8 megawatts/MW) to 37,500 shp (28 MW). However, during construction modifications were made to again increase boiler capacity and add cruising turbines which returned to the nominal power output of the Caroline class ungeared ships. Maximum propeller speed was a nominal 340 revolutions per minute. Trials comparing Champion to Caroline showed that at actual developed power of 41,000 shp (30.6 MW) in both ships, Champion achieved a speed of 29.5 knots using 470 tons of fuel per day, while Caroline achieved 29 knots using 550 tons of fuel per day. The ship could achieve 28 knots operating at the lower power of 31,000 shp (23 MW).

== Service history ==
=== World War I ===
Photograph taken from HMS Champion on 31 May 1916 at the beginning of the Battle of Jutland.

Champion was commissioned into service in the Royal Navy on 20 December 1915. She was assigned to the Grand Fleet upon completion, serving as the leader of the 13th Destroyer Flotilla through the end of World War I and until early 1919. She fought in the Battle of Jutland on 31 May–1 June 1916, during which she also was the flagship of Commodore (D), the senior commander of the fleet's destroyers.

=== Postwar ===
Champion briefly served in the 2nd Light Cruiser Squadron during 1919. She then was attached to the Royal Navy Torpedo School, HMS Vernon, from 1919 to 1924, undergoing a refit in 1923. She was decommissioned and placed under dockyard control at Portsmouth in October 1924.

In May 1925, Champion was recommissioned to serve as Gunnery Firing Ship. She was attached to the Signal School in 1928, and was used as a testbed for the Royal Navy's first remote-power-control (RPC) gunnery systems that year. She was decommissioned in December 1933 and placed under dockyard control.

== Disposal ==
Champion was sold on 28 July 1934 to Metal Industries of Rosyth, Scotland, for scrapping.
