= HMS Calliope (1914) =

Royal Navy C-class light cruiser

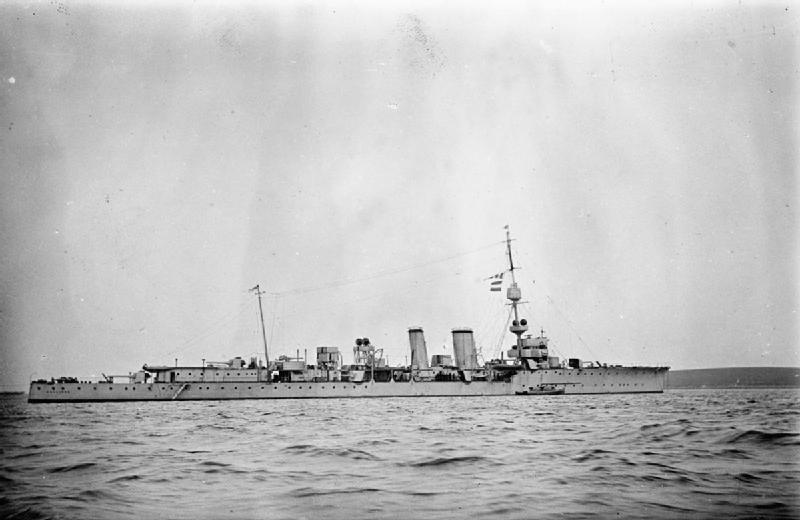

History

United Kingdom
- Name: HMS Calliope
- Namesake: Calliope
- Builder: Chatham Dockyard
- Laid down: 1 January 1914
- Launched: 17 December 1914
- Commissioned: June 1915
- Identification: Pennant number: 76 (1914); 23 (Jan 18); 78 (Apr 18); 80 (Nov 19)
- Honours and awards: Jutland 1916
- Fate: Sold for scrap 28 August 1931

General characteristics
- Class & type: C-class light cruiser
- Displacement: 3,750 tons (3,810 t)
- Length: 446 ft (136 m)
- Beam: 41.5 ft (12.6 m)
- Draught: 14.5 ft (4.4 m)
- Propulsion: Two Parsons turbines; Eight Yarrow boilers; Four propellers; 37,500 shp
- Speed: 28.5 knots (53 km/h)
- Range: carried 405 tons (772 tons maximum) of fuel oil
- Complement: 324
- Armament: 4 × BL 6-inch (152.4 mm) Mk XII guns; 2 × QF 3 inch 20 cwt AA guns; 1 × machine gun; 2 × 21 inch (533 mm) torpedo tubes (another 4 added in 1919)
- Armour: 4 inches (100 mm) side (amidships); 2.25–1.5 inches (57–38 mm) side (bows); 2.5–2 inches (64–51 mm) side (stern); 1 inch (25 mm) upper decks (amidships); 1 inch (25 mm) deck over rudder

HMS Calliope was a C-class light cruiser of the Royal Navy under construction at the outbreak of the First World War. Both Calliope and her sister ship Champion were based on the earlier cruiser Caroline. They were effectively test ships for the use of geared turbines which resulted in the one less funnel. They also received slightly thicker armour. They led into the first of the Cambrian subclass.

== Design ==
Eight light cruisers were ordered for the Royal Navy in the 1913 budget. The six ships of the Caroline class used conventional direct drive turbine engines but Calliope and Caroline each had a different engine design using geared reduction to match optimum working speeds of turbines and propellers. This followed experimental designs ordered in 1911 using geared high pressure turbines for the destroyers Badger and Beaver and in 1912 using gearing for both high pressure- and low-pressure turbines in destroyers Leonidas and Lucifer.

Calliope was built at HM Dockyard, Chatham. She was laid down in January 1914, launched on 17 December 1914, and completed in June 1915.

Calliope had four shafts as used in the Caroline design but unlike the two used in Champion. Gearing increased the efficiency of power transmission to the water so allowed smaller boilers and turbines to be used than otherwise would be the case. Nominal design power for the same target speed was therefore reduced from 40,000 shp in the Caroline class to 37,500 shp. Propeller speed was 480 rpm.

== Service history ==
=== World War I ===
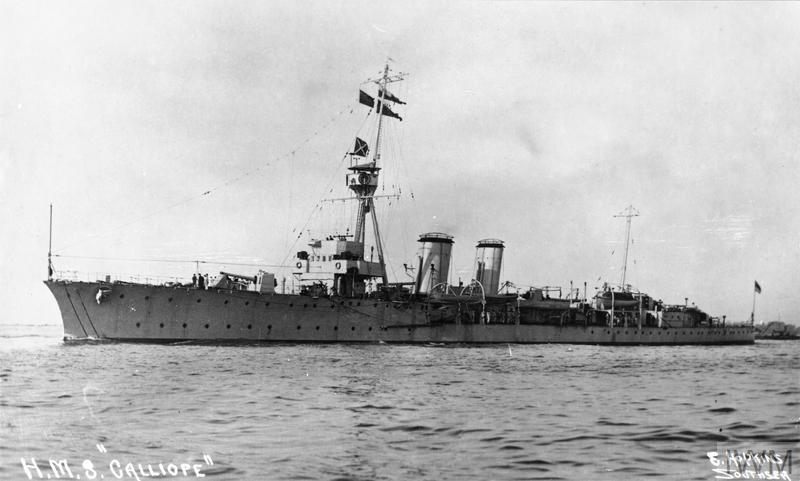
Calliope in WW1

Commissioned in June 1915, Calliope was assigned to the Grand Fleet for service as flagship of the 4th Light Cruiser Squadron. She was badly damaged by a fuel oil fire in her boiler room while at sea on 19 March 1916, but was repaired in time to be one of the five ships in the 4th Light Cruiser Squadron at the Battle of Jutland on 31 May-1 June 1916. Under the command of Commodore Charles E. Le Mesurier, HMS Calliope received a number of hits just before nightfall on 31 May (notably by the German battleships Kaiser and Markgraf), and 10 of her crew were killed.

In September 1917, Calliope helped to sink four German trawler minesweepers in the North Sea off the coast of Jutland.

=== Post-war ===
In March 1919, Calliope was commissioned for service with the 8th Light Cruiser Squadron on the North America and West Indies Station, based at the Royal Naval Dockyard in the Imperial fortress colony of Bermuda, with which she suffered another engine room fire in the Atlantic Ocean off the Azores in October 1919. She returned to Devonport for repairs, which were carried out between November 1919 and March 1920, and then recommissioned for continued service on the North America and West Indies Station. She returned to the United Kingdom in December 1920 for a refit and paid off at the Nore in January 1921. She was in the Nore Reserve from October 1921 to May 1924, when she was commissioned for service with the 2nd Cruiser Squadron in the Atlantic Fleet.

Between 1925 and 1926, Calliope was used to transport troops before paying off into dockyard control at the Nore in April 1926 for a refit. Between 1927 and 1928 she was used for trooping runs again, becoming the Senior Naval Officer's ship in the Nore Reserve in December 1927. In September 1928 received her last commission, this time with the 3rd Cruiser Squadron in the Mediterranean Fleet, which ended in January 1930 when she paid off into reserve at Portsmouth Dockyard.

== Disposal ==
Calliope was transferred to dockyard control in January 1931. She was sold for scrap on 28 August 1931 to Thos. W. Ward of Inverkeithing, Scotland.

== Honours and awards ==
Calliope received one battle honour, for the Battle of Jutland in 1916.
