= Royal Roads Military College =

Former military college in British Columbia, Canada

- Motto: Truth, Duty, Valour
- Type: Military college
- Established: 1940
- Chancellor: David Collenette (1993–1995, ex-officio as Minister of National Defence)
- Principal: Dr. John J.S. Mothersill (1984–1995)
- Commandant: Captain (N) David B Bindernagel (1994–1995)
- Undergraduates: 200+
- Location: Victoria, British Columbia, Canada; 48°26′04″N 123°28′22″W
- Campus: Hatley Park
- Closed: 1995

Royal Roads Military College (RRMC) was a Canadian military college from 1940 to 1995, located in Hatley Park, Colwood, British Columbia, near Victoria, British Columbia, Canada.

The facility now serves as the campus of Royal Roads University, a public university that offers applied and professional academic programs on-campus and via distance education.

The campus' centrepiece is Hatley Castle, which was erected by architect Samuel Maclure in the early 20th century for British Columbia coal magnate James Dunsmuir and his wife, Laura.

== History ==
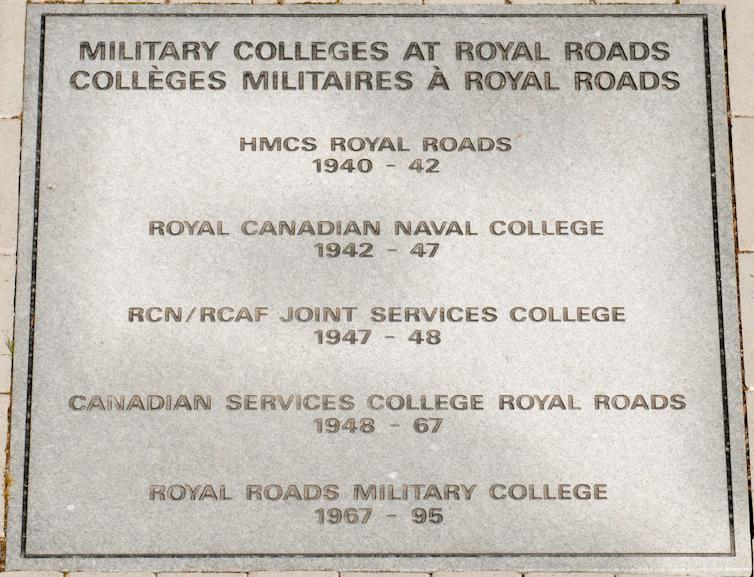
Military Colleges at Royal Roads commemorative paverstone

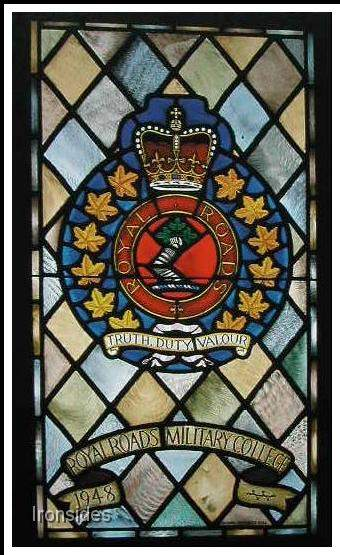
Royal Roads Military College Stained-Glass Window

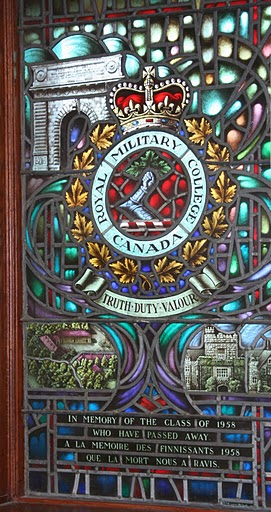
Memorial Stained Glass window, Class of 1958, Royal Military College of Canada features an image of Hatley Castle, then home of Canadian Service College Royal Roads

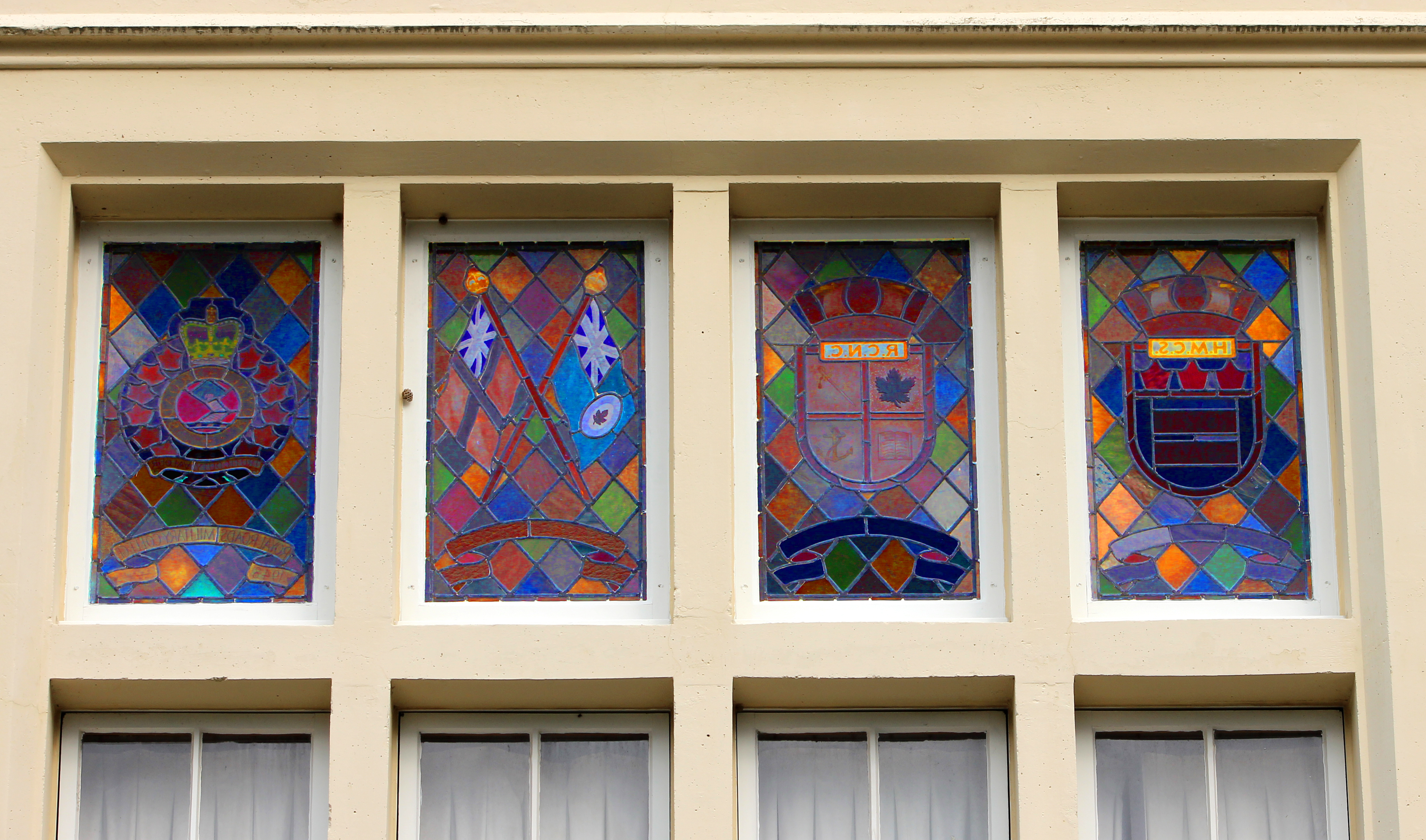
Royal Roads Military College Stained-Glass Window Grant Pavilion

The property owned by industrialist James Dunsmuir, along with his mansion Hatley Castle, was acquired by the Dominion Government in 1940. The initial plan was that the site would be used to house the British royal family during World War II. However, as the Queen Mother put it, "The children will not go without me and I will not go without the King and the King will never go".

Designed to support Canada's naval war effort, the facility began operating in December 1940 as an officer training establishment known as HMCS Royal Roads (named after the Royal Roads naval anchorage). Many of the 600 volunteer reserve officers who underwent training during this time served in the Battle of the Atlantic. HMCS Royal Roads was used to train short-term probationary Royal Canadian Navy Volunteer Reserve (RCNVR) sub-lieutenants to serve in World War II.

In 1942, because of wartime expansion, the Royal Canadian Naval College was established. In 1947, the facility became known as the RCN-RCAF Joint Services College where Royal Canadian Navy and Royal Canadian Air Force personnel were trained. The facility changed its name to Canadian Services College, Royal Roads in 1948 where personnel from all three services – the Navy, Air Force, and Army were trained during a two-year program.

In 1968 the college's name was changed to Royal Roads Military College, and in 1975, the college began granting degrees.

The gentlemen cadets of RRMC were not only required to excel in their respective academic fields, but to achieve the standard in the three other components as well, the Second Language Training component, Physical Fitness component and the Military component. Failure in any of these four components resulted in the officer cadet not being awarded the coveted RRMC degree.

In February 1994, after the end of the Cold War and under the pressure of massive spending cuts from the Government of Canada, the Department of National Defence announced that it would close Royal Roads Military College. The final class graduated in May 1995.

Hatley Park and former Royal Roads Military College was declared a National Historic Site of Canada in 1995 to commemorate the Dunsmuir family (1908–1937) and RRMC (1940–1995). The site was plaqued in 2000 as a Canadian example of an Edwardian park, with gardens, which remains practically intact.

The name Royal Roads was drawn from geography. The name refers to an anchorage located in Juan de Fuca Strait between the city of Victoria, British Columbia and Albert Bay. HMCS Royal Roads was located on a property originally purchased by James Dunsmuir in 1902. Dunsmuir was a former British Columbian premier and lieutenant governor. The Hatley Park Estate originally comprised 650 acres (2.6 km^{2}). The Dunsmuir family added Hatley Castle, which was completed in 1908. The Canadian Department of National Defence purchased Hatley Park, almost in its entirety, in 1940, for $75,000. This sum was roughly the value of the fence surrounding the property.

As Executive Officer, Commander Reginald Amand (Jumbo) Webber D.S.C., C.D. served there till late 1942. On June 21, 1995, after negotiations with the Department of National Defence and the Government of British Columbia, the British Columbia government passed the Royal Roads University Act, creating Royal Roads University. The campus is currently leased from the federal government under a $1, 50-year lease agreement with Royal Roads University which was announced in 2001. The Department of National Defence leases approximately 55 hectares of land for the campus to Royal Roads University, and has entered into a five-year Renewable Management Agreement with the University for the maintenance of the remaining 175 hectares of property owned by the Department of National Defence.

The athletic facilities at Hatley Park included a swimming pool, five tennis courts, two squash courts, three soccer pitches, one rugby field, two ball diamonds, a quarter-mile track, a 6.1 km cross country course, jetty and boat house. Cadets played sports including rugby, soccer, baseball, golf, scuba diving, track and field, wrestling, ball hockey, broomball, and ice hockey.

== Squadrons of the Cadet Wing ==
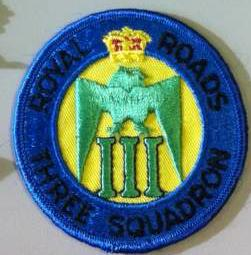
Royal Roads Military College Squadron No. 3 patch

The undergraduate student body, known as the Cadet Wing, was sub-divided into four smaller groupings called squadrons, under the guidance and supervision of senior cadets. Until the late 70s the four squadrons were populated by undergraduate cadets. When the college started training NCMs it was reorganized so that the first three squadrons were for cadets while 4 Squadron was for mature students from the University Training Program Non-Commissioned Members program. Although squadrons were not named, they were represented by embroidered patches bearing mythological figures, which were worn on the sleeves of the cadet workdress. The squadrons were subdivided into flights, which were named after historical figures (explorers). Cadets competed by squadron in drill and intramurals.

Squadron #	Flight	Flight
1	Cartier	Fraser
2	Champlain	Mackenzie
3	Hudson	Lasalle
4	Vancouver	Thompson

== Band ==
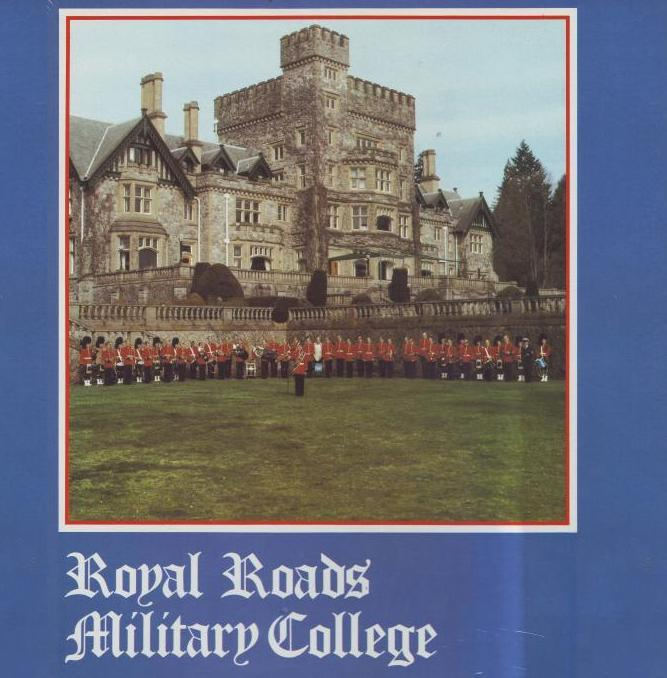
Royal Roads Military College album

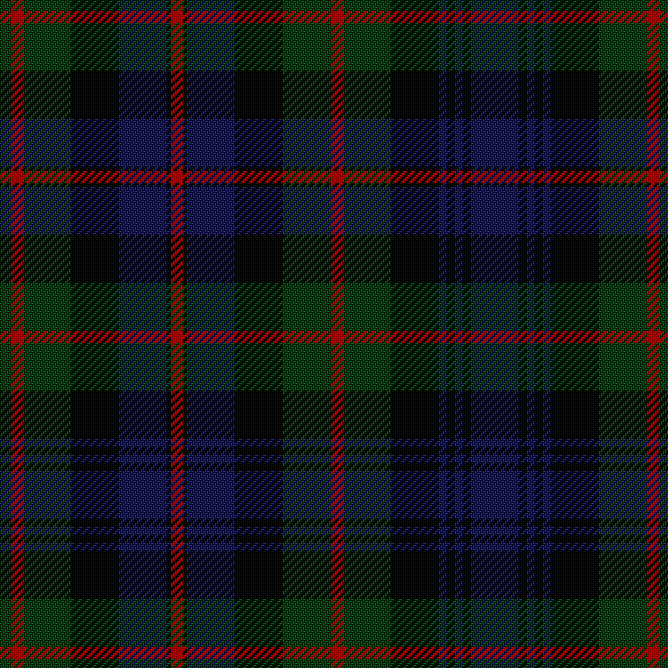
Murray of Atholl Tartan

By 1955, Royal Roads had a drum and bugle corps. The Brass and Reed Band had already been formed by 1975. WO George Dunn, the first full-time Bandmaster, served from 1975 to 1979. The Pipes and Drums performed at parades, public relation trips and recruit shows. The Pipe Section and the Drum Section performed at mess dinners; parades; sporting events; ceremonies (official or squadron); weddings; funerals; public relations; wing events; Christmas and Graduation Balls; private events; and holidays.

== Notable historical milestones ==
Year	Significance
1940	The Canadian Government purchased the land for Royal Roads.
1941	HMCS Royal Roads was used by the Royal Canadian Navy to train five classes of officers, each with 100 Acting Sub-Lieutenants.; A decision was made to phase out the Sub-Lieutenant Officer training at HMCS Royal Roads and to establish a Naval College which would open in September 1942.; A recruiting campaign to attract 100 Naval Cadets was conducted in 1941–1942.; Auxiliary buildings on the Hatley estate such as the Mews stables and garage were converted into classroom space.; A new building called the Grant Building located behind Hatley Castle was built in order to provide a mess hall and dormitories, as well as classrooms and laboratories.; Architects John Young McCarter and with Robert W. Chadney constructed the Royal Canadian Naval College buildings 1942–3.
1942–47	The Royal Canadian Naval College was established to train marine and naval officers.; Vice-Admiral Percy W. Nelles, Chief of Naval Staff: "While you are here, work hard and play hard, and make yourself tougher than any enemy you will ever meet."
1946	The Royal Canadian Navy and Royal Canadian Air Force College offered the first two years of university-level programs to Royal Canadian Air Force and Navy officers.
1947	The Royal Canadian Air Force and Royal Canadian Navy became partners in the college life at HMCS Royal Roads.; The college name was changed to the Royal Canadian Navy-Royal Canadian Air Force College at HMCS Royal Roads.
1948	The Canadian Army became a partner in the college.; The tri-service college name was changed to Canadian Services College Royal Roads.; The college offered the first two years of university-level programs to 345 Royal Canadian Navy, Canadian Army and Royal Canadian Air Force officers.; The Stone Frigate HMCS Royal Roads was paid off.
1950	The Old Brigade, alumni celebrating 50 + years since they entered one of the military colleges, are inducted.
1956	Scarlet tunics introduced.
1968	Royal Roads Military College (RRMC) offered the first two years of university-level programs to Royal Canadian Air Force and Navy officers.
1975	The Royal Roads Military College Degrees Act was passed by the Government of British Columbia, allowing RRMC to grant degrees.
1983/4	The Royal Roads Military College band consisting of 15 pipers and drummers and 30 brass-and-reed musician recorded an LP.; Petty Officer First Class Gabby R. Bruner, RRMC bandmaster from 1979–85 composed "Hatley Park" as the official quick march for RRMC and "Dunsmuir Castle", for the Visit of Queen Elizabeth to RRMC in 1983.
1984	The first female cadet enrolled at RRMC creating a slight shift culturally in the Canadian Military Colleges, as well as in the CF as a whole.
May 11, 1986	RRMC was granted the Freedom of the City for outstanding military service to the community.
1990	Prometheous and the Vulture, an abstract stone sculpture was created by Jay Unwin for the 50th anniversary of Royal Roads Military College.
1995	following the end of the Cold War and massive government cutbacks on defence spending, the Department of National Defence closed Royal Roads Military College (RRMC).; RRMC Royal Roads Military College is no longer a military institution, and is now maintained by the Government of British Columbia as Royal Roads University.; The loss of RRMC along with their many traditions and history as military colleges still remains a bitter event for many cadets and alumni.

== Facilities ==
The Register of the Government of Canada Heritage Buildings lists 9 recognized buildings and 1 classified building on the former grounds of the Royal Roads Military College.

Name	Address	Coordinates	Government recognition (CRHP №)	Wikidata ID	Image
Belmont Road Main Gatehouse BEL 13 (1908), Royal Roads University formerly Royal Roads Military College	Hatley Park National Historic Site; Recognized Federal Heritage Building 2000; Colwood BC	48°26′13″N 123°27′40″W	Federal (2840)		Upload Photo
Cow Barn and Dairy RR6 (1912–16)	Hatley Park National Historic Site; Recognized Federal Heritage Building 2000; The original Tudor-style dairy and cattle barns were converted into laboratories and classrooms for physics and oceanography. The building was refurbished in 1998 into research and computer laboratories Colwood BC	48°25′49″N 123°28′52″W	Federal (2841)		Upload Photo
Grant Block, Building 24 (1942) Royal Roads University formerly Royal Roads Military College	Hatley Park National Historic Site; main academic building, laboratories, cafeteria, and offices named for first Commanding Officer of HMCS Royal Roads, Captain John Moreau Grant. The building, which was designed by architects John Young McCarter with Robert W. Chadney, was recently renovated. Colwood; Recognized Federal Heritage Building 1990 BC	48°26′07″N 123°28′24″W	Federal (3664)		
Gymnasium RR22, – sports complex (1942) Royal Roads University formerly Royal Roads Military College	Hatley Park National Historic Site includes gymnasium, weight room, fitness studio, squash courts, outdoor tennis courts. The building was designed by architects John Young McCarter with Robert W. Chadney. Colwood BC	48°25′56″N 123°28′42″W	Federal (2844)		Upload Photo
Hatley Park National Historic Site (1908)/ Former Royal Roads Military College/Royal Roads University	2005 Sooke Road; administrative centre of Royal Roads University. From 1941 until 1943 when Grant Block was completed, the Castle served as dormitory and mess hall for cadets and staff officers at RRMC. Classified Federal Heritage Building 1986, Registry of Historic Places of Canada; Colwood BC	48°26′04″N 123°28′22″W	Federal (15749)		
Nixon Block RR24A (1954 to 1956) Royal Roads University formerly Royal Roads Military College	Hatley Park National Historic Site classrooms, dormitories named after the former LCdr. Edward Atcherley Eckersall Nixon, Royal Navy (RN), Commandant of Royal Naval College of Canada 1911–22, in particular when it was re-established in Esquimalt, British Columbia in 1918; Colwood; Recognized Federal Heritage Building 2000 BC	48°26′06″N 123°28′28″W	Federal (2843)		Upload Photo
Stable / Garage RR4 (1914) Royal Roads University formerly Royal Roads Military College	Hatley Park National Historic Site; Recognized Federal Heritage Building 2000; Colwood BC	48°25′52″N 123°28′43″W	Federal (2842)		Upload Photo
Swimming Pool RR22A (1959) Royal Roads University formerly Royal Roads Military College	Hatley Park National Historic Site; two-storey, white concrete building composed of horizontal cubic volumes. Colwood; Recognized Federal Heritage Building 2000 BC	48°25′54″N 123°28′43″W	Federal (2845)		Upload Photo
Warrant Officer's Quarters Royal Roads University formerly Royal Roads Military College	Hatley Park National Historic Site; Colwood BC	48°25′57″N 123°27′08″W	Federal (4277)		Upload Photo

== Other buildings ==
Building (Year built)	Significance	Photo
Arbutus Building	academic classrooms, administrative offices, a computer lab, and a canteen	
Boat House (1989)	boat house	
Coronel Memorial Library	memorial library honours Battle of Coronel	
dock (1990)	dock	
Guard House Building 38	Recognized Federal Heritage Building 2002	
Gatehouse Lodge RR8 (1912 to 1916)	Recognized Federal Heritage Building 2000	
Hatley Park / Former Royal Roads Military College (1908–13)	designated National Historic Site of Canada 1995	
Mews Conference Centre (1912)	James Dunsmuir's stables and garage later converted to classrooms, dormitory, social centre and conference centre. Registered Federal Heritage Building	
Millward Wing (of the Nixon Building) (1991)	Offices, dormitories, named for former Commandant Air Vice-Marshal James Bert Millward DFC (Bar), GdG(F), CD, RCAF 1949–52 the 4th Commandant of RRMC.	

== Royal Roads Military College Museum ==
Royal Roads Military College Museum
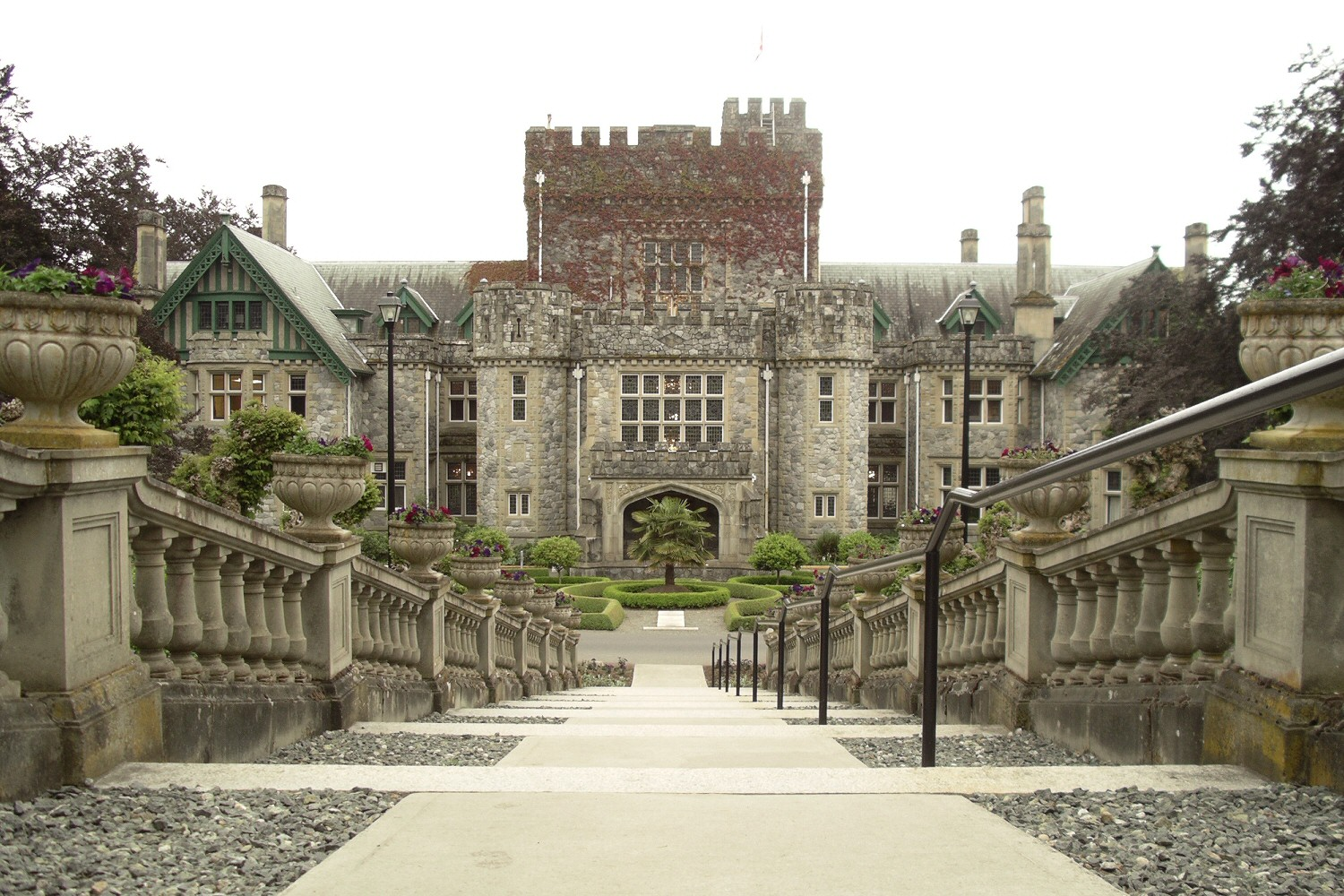
- Location: Hatley Castle, on the campus of the Royal Roads University
- Website: www.rmc.ca/other/museum/index_e.html (Official)

Hatley Castle is home to the Royal Roads Military College Museum.

The museum is located in Hatley Castle, on the campus of the Royal Roads University and former campus of the Royal Roads Military College of Canada. The Museum mandate is to collect, conserve, research and display material relating to the history of the Royal Roads Military College, its former cadets and its site.

The Royal Roads Military College Museum is a member of the Canadian Museums Association and the Organization of Military Museums of Canada Inc. The Royal Roads Museum is an accredited museum within the Canadian Forces Museum System.

The museum has formed a cooperating association of friends of the museum to assist with projects.

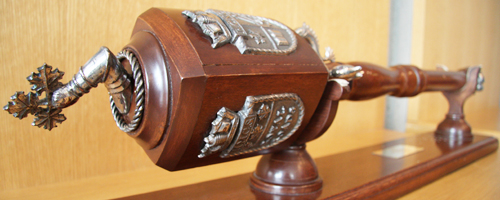
Royal Roads Military College mace

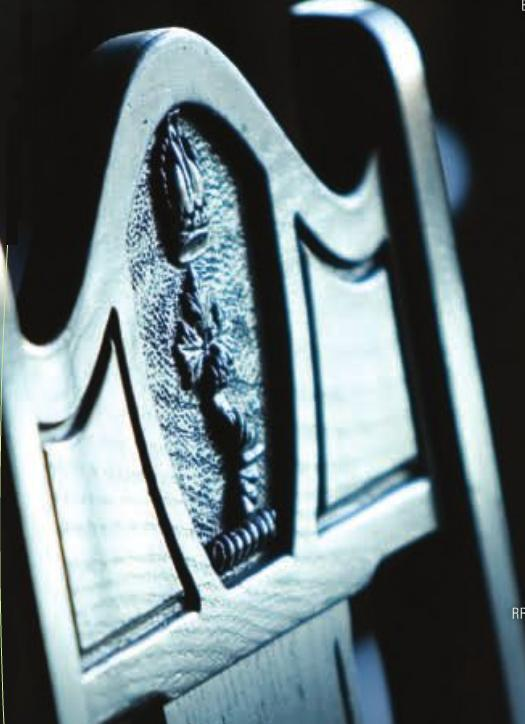
Royal Roads Military College chair

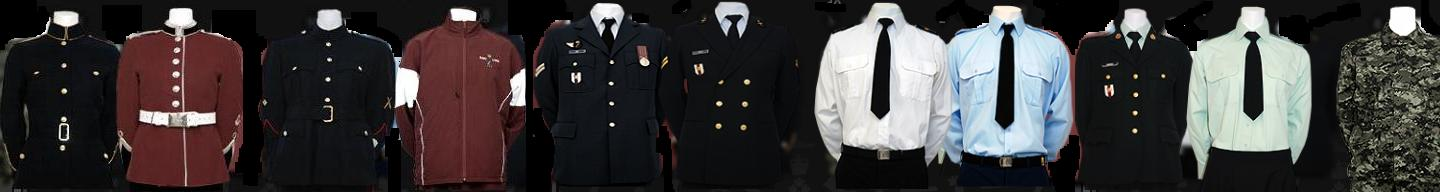
Canadian Military College uniforms

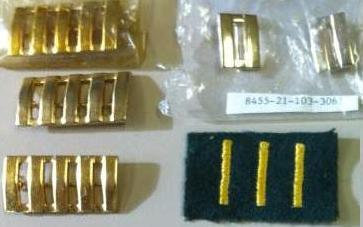
Canadian Military College rank and year bars

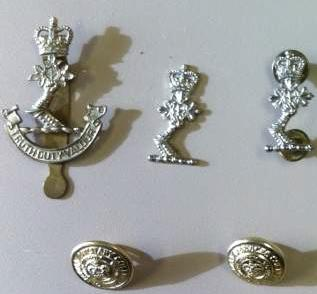
Canadian Military College badges and buttons (post-1953 crown)

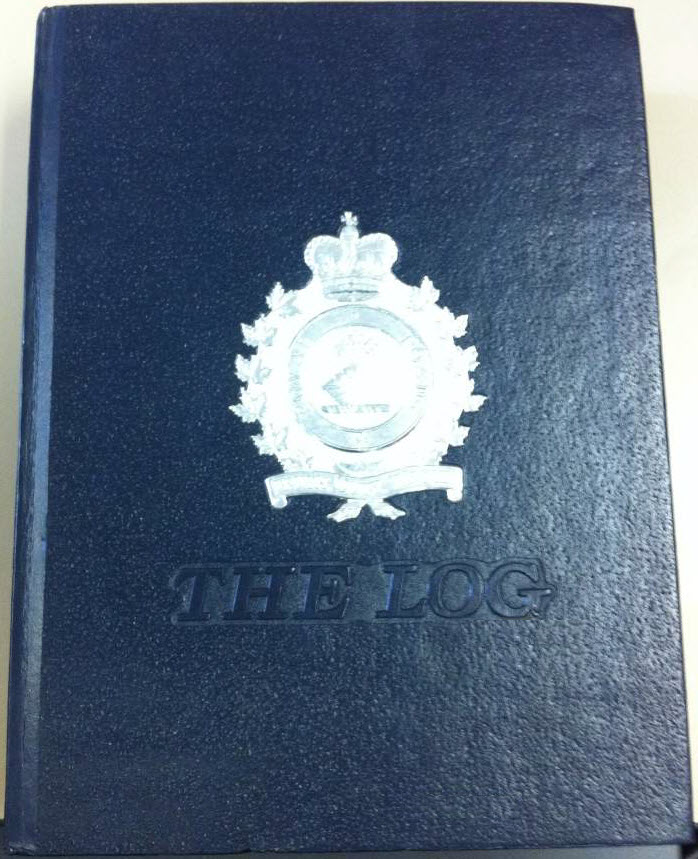
The Log Royal Roads Military College yearbook

Royal Military College of Canada alumni button

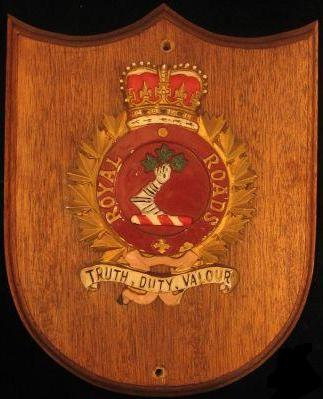
Royal Roads Military College Plaque

== Traditions ==
Tradition	Significance
Blanket toss	Blanket toss of senior class members after the last waltz at the Graduation ball
Ceremonial mace	Symbolizes the authority of the college, as granted in the name of the Sovereign (currently His Majesty King Charles III). When carried into the ceremony and placed on stage, the mace signals the opening of the convocation. It was last used at the RRMC postgraduate convocation in 1995. The mace's four sides commemorate the sequence of institutions at Royal Roads. It was made prior to the first graduating class from Royal Roads Military College in May 1977.
'Change of command ceremony'	The former commandant offers farewell and best wishes to the college and to the new commandant. The new commandant accepts a first salute as the cadet wing marches past.
Christening bell	Following naval tradition, a ship's bell was used as a baptism font in the college chapel for christenings and the names of the children were later inscribed on the bell. The ship's bell from RRMC is currently used in the chapel at Royal Military College of Canada.
HMCS Royal Roads' bell	During the life of the college, HMCS Royal Roads' bell was displayed in the porte-cochere of Hatley Castle. After the closing of RRMC, HMCS Royal Roads' bell was kept in the museum at CFB Esquimalt. It was officially repatriated on 10 September 2010 during the Royal Roads University 2010 Homecoming. The bell is prominently displayed in the new entrance to Grant block in the foyer that links Grant block and the new academic building.
College toast	RRMC club toast to absent comrades meaning those who have fallen in action or otherwise died
Colours	After the last parade of RRMC in spring 1995, the colours were deposited into the care of Christ Church Cathedral in Victoria, British Columbia where they are on display with several other retired colours including "Royal Canadian Navy" and "Royal Canadian Air Force".
Feu de Joie	An honour guard perform a rifle salute with field artillery, or more commonly, rifles using blank ammunition.
Ghosts and haunting	The B.C. Society of Paranormal Investigation and Research into the Supernatural have investigated stories of paranormal activity in and around Hatley Castle
Grace	Officer cadets ate meals cafeteria style; A senior term was responsible to say a traditional Navy grace for the table “For what we are about to receive, thank God. Carry on…”
Graduation and Commissioning Parade	in honour of graduating cadets: Graduating students are presented with their Officer's Commissions in the Canadian Forces.; Officer Cadets display their foot drill and sword movements, Feux de Joie an honour guard performs a rifle salute with field artillery
Jacket exchange	The RRMC Director of Cadets exchanges tunics with a I Year Officer Cadet at RRMC Christmas Dinner.
Just Passing By	When a graduate of the RRMC pilots an aircraft in the vicinity of Victoria, British Columbia he or she conducts an impromptu airshow over the college.
Lord Horatio Nelson's quote hung over the entrance to the Grant Building	A replica of the quote, "Duty is the great business of a sea officer: All private considerations must give way to it however painful it is." was returned to Royal Roads University campus for Homecoming in 2011.
Marches	Quick – Hatley Park; Slow – Royal Roads Slow (Going Home)
Naval heraldry	Royal Roads badge 1 features a name on a shield; Royal Roads badge 2 features crown plus anchor, open book & spray of three maple leaves.; Royal Canadian Naval College badge features maple leaf, sword, book, anchor
Obstacle course race	Course for recruits set up by the cadets' immediate predecessors
Old Brigade	Alumni who entered military college 50+ years before wear unique berets and ties, have the Right of the Line on reunion weekend memorial parades, and present the College cap badge to the First Year cadets on the First Year Badging Parade. Each class traditionally marks its 50-year anniversary and entry into the Old Brigade with a gift.
Skylarks	Annual class practical joke or prank; Apples taken from the Commandant's trees at 2am were brought back to the doors of popular seniors.; A whaler was taken to dockyard and the Navy Dockyard flag was liberated and run up the RRMC mast.; A dinghy was strung up the mast in front of the Castle and left there.; A cow was chained to the top of Neptune stairs where the Director of Cadets held his morning parade.; The Cadet Wing Commander had the 1st year cadets muster in the common rooms while 2nd years took their rooms apart, moved their mattresses out and ran their sheets from building to building. The cadets scrambled back to their rooms to prepare for an inspection of their rooms to find no beds.; During 100 days to grad parties, 4th years were not allowed to sleep in their dorm. Instead, the 1st years took their beds and moved them around the college. Cadets might find their bed – up a tree or in a hall. The DCadet found a cadet's bed in the DCadets residence and another in the yard.; The University of Victoria copper dome was painted 'RRMC #1' in 1981 by second year cadets who formed a rep skylark team completing several skylarks on and off campus.; Cadets took a whaler to Esquimalt dockyards and attached a can painted to look like an explosive device to the side of destroyer.; Cadets would routinely kidnap senior cadets and/or staff members, transport them to the rock (a tiny rock island in the lagoon) and maroon them there. On at least one occasion, tables were turned and the "victims" were able to maroon one or more of the kidnapper cadets themselves.
Sweetheart brooch	Officer cadets gave their dates an enamel brooch in lieu of a corsage for formal dances at Christmas, and Graduation.
White peacock	Blue Indian peafowl have lived free on the college grounds since the 1960s. Albert, a rare white peacock resident since RRMC days, died in 2003.

== Commandants ==
#	Name	Year	Significance	Photo
	Captain John Moreau Grant, CBE, RCN	1940–42, 1942–46	First commanding officer of HMCS Royal Roads 1940-4; He was in command of Royal Canadian Naval College 1942-4; Grant Building was named in his honour.	
	Captain W. B. Creery, CBE, CD, RCN	1946–48	2nd Commandant, RRMC	
	Captain Herbert Sharples Rayner, DSC (& Bar), CD, RCN	1948–49	3rd Commandant, RRMC; As Vice Admiral, Rayner was 8th & last Chief of the Naval Staff 1960–1964.	
	Air Vice Marshal James Bert Millward DFC (Bar), CdeG(F), CD, RCAF	1949–52	4th Commandant, RRMC	
2253	Major General Cameron Bethel Ware DSO, CD, PPCLI (RMC 1931)	1952–54	5th Commandant, RRMC	
2444	Captain John A. Charles, CMM, CD RCN (RMC 1935)	1954–57	6th Commandant, RRMC	
	Colonel P.S. Cooper OBE, CD, L Edm R	1957–60	7th Commandant, RRMC	
	Group Captain Alan Frederick Avant DSO, DFC, CD, RCAF	1960–63	8th Commandant, RRMC	
2576	Captain William Prine Hayes CD, RCN	1963–65	9th Commandant, RRMC	
	Group Captain O.B. Wurtele, CD, RCAF	1965–68	10th Commandant, RRMC	
RRA18	Colonel Kenneth E. Lewis CMM, CD CF (RRMC ‘47)	1968–70	11th Commandant, RRMC	
	Capt(N) R.C.K. Peers CD CF	1970–76	12th Commandant, RRMC	]
	Colonel J.H. Roddick CD, CF	1976–79	13th Commandant, RRMC	
3912	Colonel George L. Logan CD CF (RHC) (RRMC/RMC ‘57)	1979–83	14th Commandant, RRMC; `Colonel George Logan` (1983) march composed by OCdt David V. Ferguson in his honour	
4271	Capt(N) William J. A. Draper CD CF Adec	1983–84	15th Commandant, RRMC	
6440	Captain (N) A.J. ('Tony') Goode CD CF (Royal Military College Saint-Jean/RMC 1965)	1984–87	16th Commandant, RRMC	
7264	Colonel Ross K.R. Betts CD CF (RMC 1967)	1987–89	17th Commandant, RRMC	
8335	Colonel Claude J.E.C. Naud CD A de C. CF (CMR/RMC 1970)	1989–91	18th Commandant, RRMC	
8241	Lieutenant-General (ret'd) Vaughan Michael Caines, A de C, CF (CMR/RMC 1970) CMM, CD	1991–94	19th Commandant, RRMC; Chair of the DND/CF Ombudsman Advisory Committee	
9318	Captain (N) David B. Bindernagel CD (RRMC RMC 1972)	1994–95	20th Commandant, RRMC	

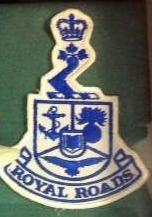
Royal Military College of Canada embroidered patch

== Principals ==
Name	Year
Commander Ketchum	1942–45
Captain Ogle	1945–51
Professor Brown	1951–55
Professor Cook	1955–61
Professor Graham	1961–84
3237 Doctor John J.S. Mothersill (RMC 1954)	1984–95

== Notable professors ==
#	Name	taught	Significance
	Sir C. S. Wright	RRMC 1967–69	explorer, Terra Nova Expedition
	Frank Davey	RRMC 1963–1966; 1967–1969	poet, author

== Notable alumni ==
#	Name	Grad	Significance	Photo
13705	Constable José Manuel Agostinho	RRMC 1982	Royal Canadian Mounted Police officer, was killed in the performance of his duties near Millet, Alberta, on 7/4/2005. He is remembered on the Canadian Police and Peace Officer's Memorial (panel 14–26).	
14008	Alan Cumyn	RRMC 1983	Canadian novelist	
RCNC115	Honourable Douglas Everett	RCNC 1943–45	Canadian automobile dealer, lawyer, and retired Senator	
11510	Barry Kennedy	RRMC ‘77	fighter pilot, comedian, author, host of Discovery Channel's Out In The Cold	
RCNC40	Bev Koester	RCNC40 1944	Canadian naval officer, civil servant and Clerk of the Canadian House of Commons	
3528	General (Ret) Paul David Manson O.C., CMM, CD, B.Sc., D.M.S.	RRMC 1956	Military leader, business executive and volunteer; former Chief of Defence Staff	
13738	Colonel (Ret'd) Chris Hadfield	RRMC/RMC 1982	Astronaut	
5576	Leonard Lee	1960 (RRMC); 1962 (RMC)	founder of Lee Valley Tools and Canica Design.	
12320	General Walter Natynczyk CD	RRMC CMR 1979	Military leader, Chief of Defence Staff	
	Hubert Seamans	RRMC 1973	businessperson, banker, politician	
RCNC205	Jim Thompson (powerboat racing)	RRMC 1944	businessman, athlete	
RCNSE54	Rear Admiral Robert Timbrell, CMM, DSC, CD	RCNC 1937	Military leader	
15696	General Jonathan Vance CMM MSC CD	RRMC 1986	Chief of the Defence Staff of the Canadian Armed Forces	
14098	Chris Wattie	RRMC 1979	soldier, journalist, author	
16538	Lieutenant-General Wayne Eyre CMM MSC CD	RRMC/RMC 1988	Commander of the Canadian Army of the Canadian Armed Forces, Chief of the Defence Staff of the Canadian Armed Forces	

== Quotes ==
#	Name	Quote
	Mr. Kasper, 3rd Session, 35th Parliament, Legislative Assembly of British Columbia	"Be it resolved that this House strongly condemn the Government of Canada's unfair decision to close five defence installations in British Columbia, including the Royal Roads Military College, resulting in the elimination of nearly 900 civilian and military jobs; and be it further resolved that this House, noting the reputation of academic excellence offered at the Royal Roads Military College during its 55-year history, and in light of the recent $20 million upgrade, urge the Government of Canada to re-examine the utility of closing the only military college in Western Canada, affecting 230 civilian and military jobs."

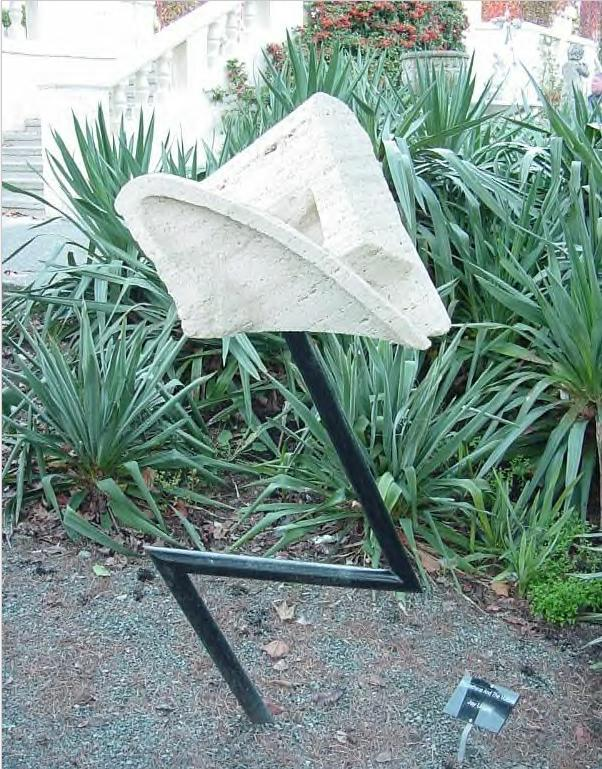
Prometheous and the Vulture, sculpture by Jay Unwin 1995, Royal Roads Military College

== Filming location ==
The campus of Royal Roads has been used as a film set for:

- Professor Xavier's School for Gifted Youngsters in the X-Men movies.
- The Luthor Mansion, the estate belonging to Lex Luthor in TV series Smallville
- The Shady Glen School in the 1997 movie, Masterminds
- The hideout in MacGyver, season 5, "The Legend of the Holy Rose, part 2"
- The home for the Royal Family in the Seven Days TV series, episode 9, season 2, "Love and Other Disasters"
- Little Women, starring Winona Ryder (1994)
- The Changeling, starring George C. Scott (1979)
- The Queen mansion in the CW series Arrow (2012)

== Books ==
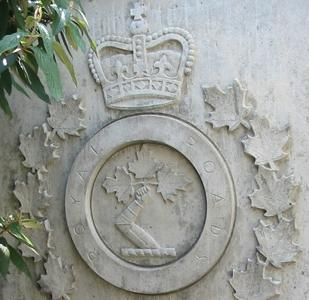
Royal Roads Military College carving

- Doug Cope "The Roadants" (Royal Roads Military College, Victoria, BC 2013)
- Peter J.S. Dunnett & W. Kim Rempel Royal Roads Military College 1940–1990, A Pictorial Retrospective (Royal Roads Military College, Victoria, BC 1990)
- Maurice Robinson, Bev Hall, Paul Price Royal Roads : a celebration (Natural Light Productions, Victoria, BC, 1995)
- "Royal Roads – a public university with a difference" : a proposal prepared by Hatley Educational Society for presentation to the Advisory Panel on the Future of Royal Roads (Hatley Educational Society, British Columbia 1995)

== See also ==
- Royal Military College of Canada
- Royal Military College Saint-Jean
- The Canadian Crown and the Canadian Forces
- Monarchy in British Columbia
- Royal Roads University
- Canadian Military Colleges
