= CCEE =

The acronym CCEE may refer to:

- Council of the Bishops' Conferences of Europe
- Canadian Centre for Environmental Education
