= Hatley Park National Historic Site =

Historic estate in Colwood, Canada

Hatley Park
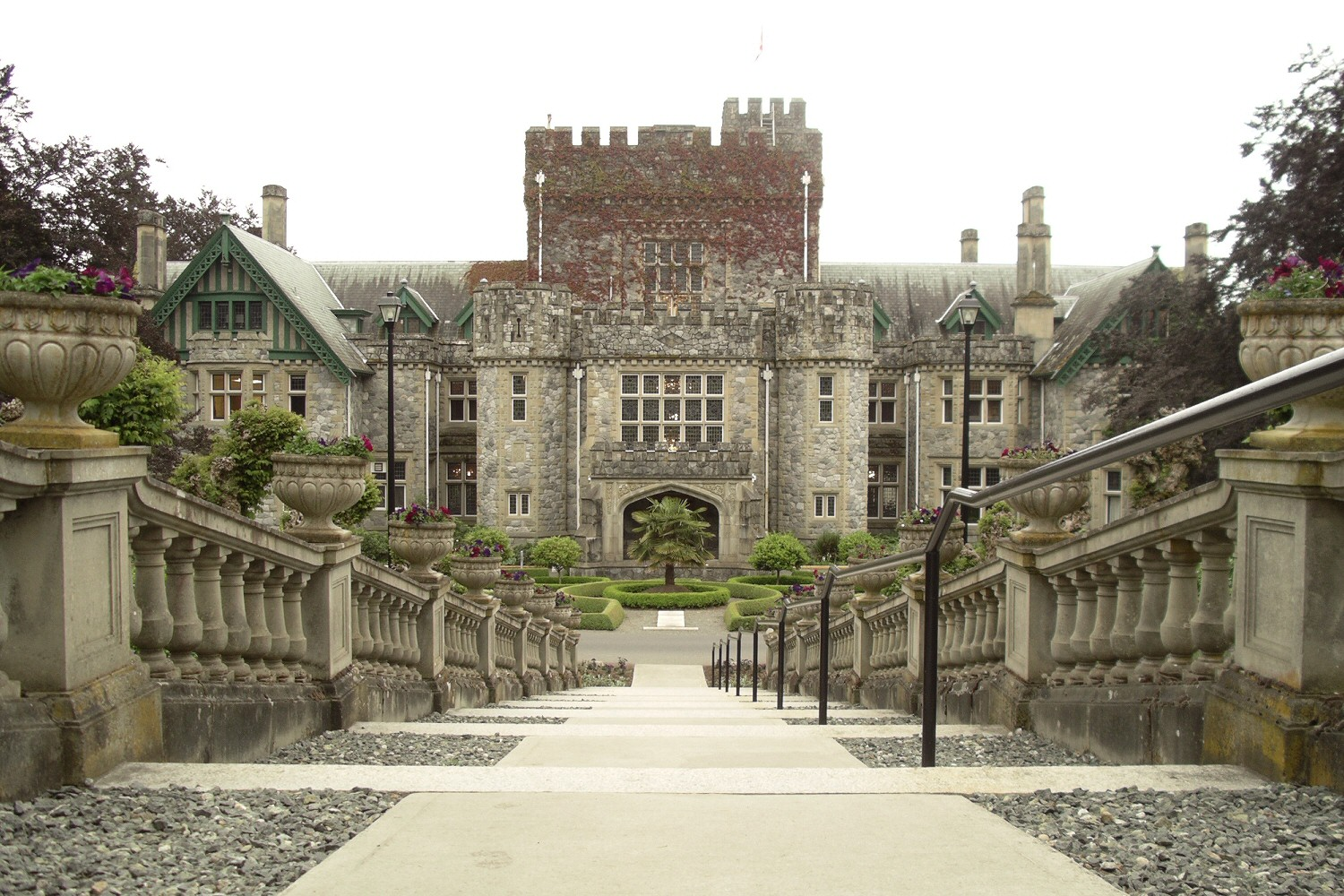
- Interactive map of Hatley Park
- 48.4343°N 123.4724°W
- Type: University Museum; Historic House Museum
- Location: 2005 Sooke Road; Colwood, British Columbia, Canada

History
- Built: 1908–1913
- Built for: James Dunsmuir

Site notes
- Architect: Samuel Maclure
- Architectural style: Tudor Revival
- Owner: Department of National Defence

National Historic Site of Canada
- Official name: Hatley Park / Former Royal Roads Military College National Historic Site of Canada
- Designated: 6 July 1995
- Reference no.: 868

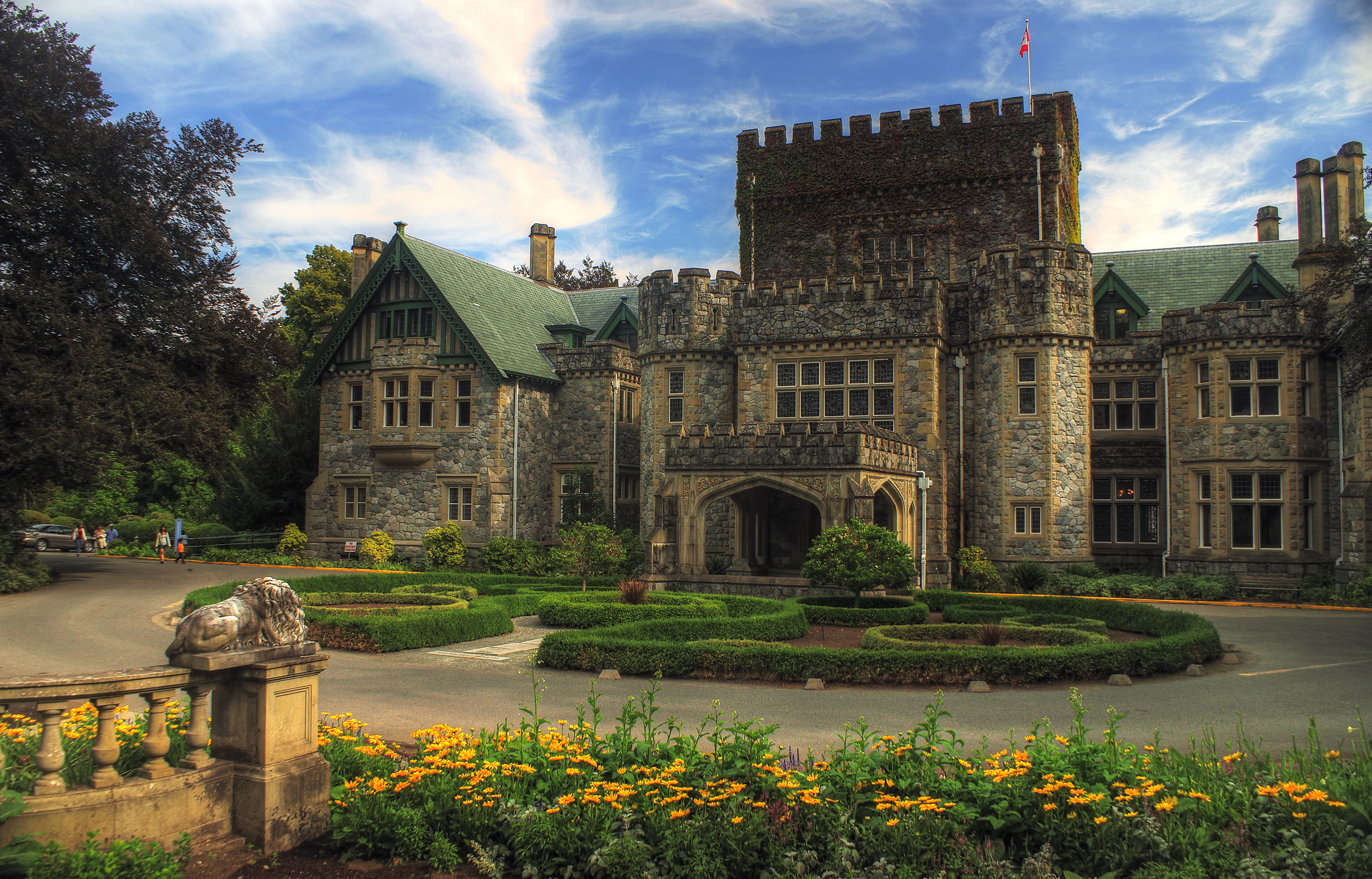
Hatley Castle, August 2009

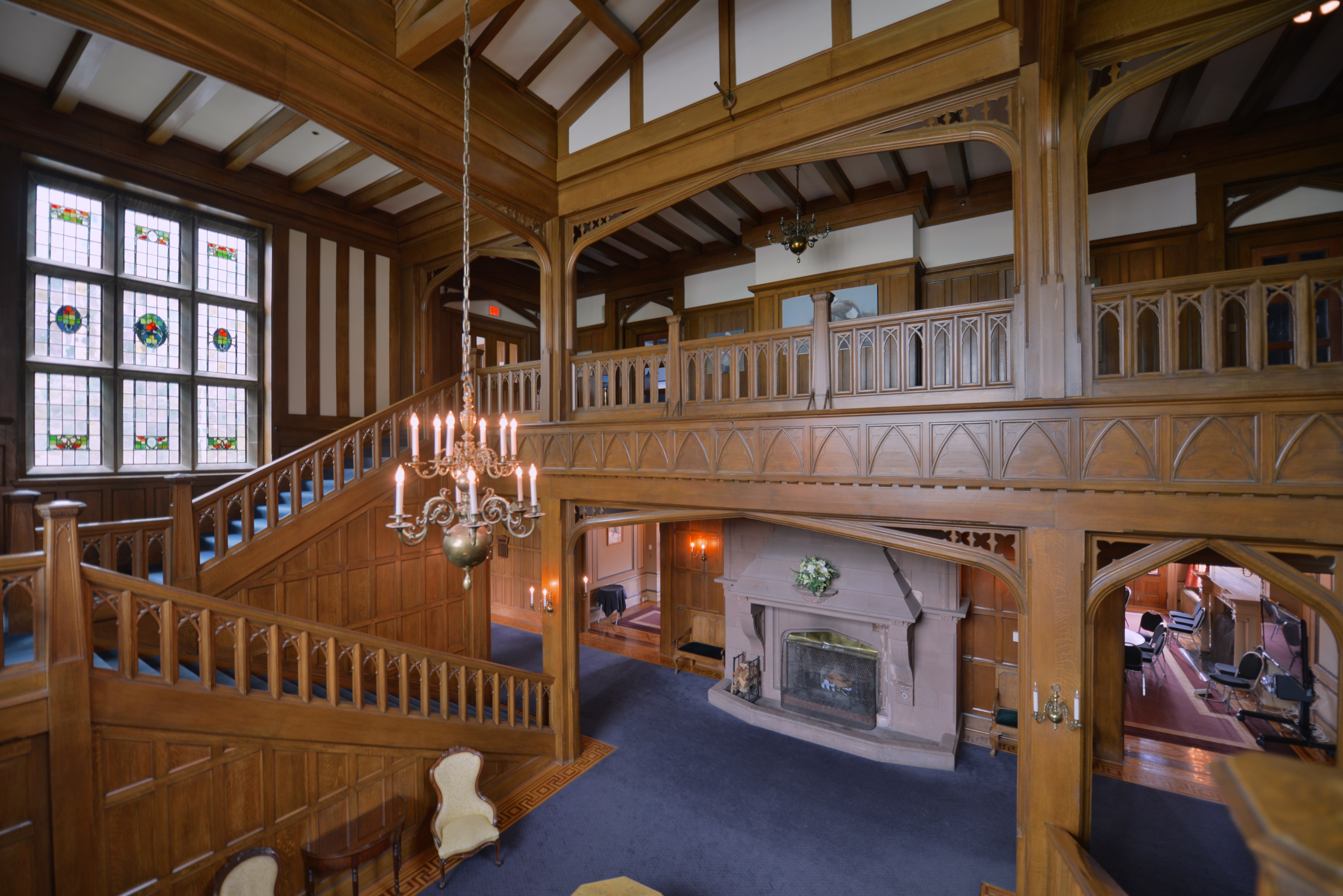
Main Hall of Hatley Castle

Hatley Park National Historic Site is located in Colwood, British Columbia, in Greater Victoria. It is the site of Hatley Castle, a Classified Federal Heritage Building. Since 1995, the mansion and estate have been used for the public Royal Roads University. From the 1940s to 1995, it was used to train military officers. (Note: Information about Hatley Gardens copied with permission from Hatley Park website)

The extensive grounds of the historic site have formal gardens, former farmland, and trails through mature stands of first and second-growth forest, including large Douglas fir and western red cedar.

== History ==
=== Hatley Castle and Gardens ===
In 1906, B.C.'s Lieutenant Governor, James Dunsmuir, who was of Scottish descent, purchased the property. He and his wife Laura commissioned the renowned Canadian architect Samuel Maclure to build a 40-room mansion in the Scottish baronial style; the Tudor Revival style was popular in the Edwardian period. The Dunsmuirs created many beautiful formal gardens using the services of renowned American garden designers Franklin Brett and George D. Hall of Boston, Massachusetts. The Dunsmuirs named their estate "Hatley Park", in the tradition of British and European private estates. The castle became a landmark and was occupied by descendants of the Dunsmuir family until after the Great Depression, in 1937.

Following the death of Laura Dunsmuir in 1937 the estate was sold to the Government of Canada in 1939. The government sold off some of the land and during five days in June 1939, "Maynard & Sons" conducted a public auction of the mansion's contents totaling 927 lots.

A Historic Sites and Monuments Board of Canada plaque reads:

Hatley Park. This superb example of an Edwardian park was laid out for James and Laura Dunsmuir in the early 20th century. At its centre stands a Tudor Revival mansion, whose picturesque design is enhanced by a rich array of decoration and fine craftsmanship. The grounds, featuring a variety of native and exotic vegetation, unfold from formal gardens to recreational spaces, farmlands and forests. Acquired by the Canadian armed forces in 1940, Hatley Park evolved to meet the needs of Royal Roads Military College in a manner that has preserved its essential Edwardian character.

The Royal Roads Military College band consisting of 15 pipers and drummers and 30 brass-and-reed musician recorded an LP in 1983–1984. Petty Officer First Class Gabby R. Bruner, RRMC bandmaster from 1979 to 1985, composed "Hatley Park" as the official quick march for the RRMC and "Dunsmuir Castle" for the Visit of Queen Elizabeth to RRMC in 1983.

In 2008, the 100th anniversary of Hatley Castle was celebrated.

=== Planned royal residence ===
At the outbreak of the Second World War, contingency plans were made for King George VI, his wife, Queen Elizabeth; and their two daughters, Princesses Elizabeth and Margaret, to reside in Canada in the event of an invasion of Britain. The family's primary options were stately homes in England, but Victoria, BC, was the backup site in the event that German troops reached the Midlands.

The federal Crown-in-Council purchased Hatley Castle in 1940 for use as the King's royal residence. The royal family and British government decided against the former leaving the UK during the war and the King and Queen stayed in London, while the Princesses were located at Windsor Castle.

=== Royal Roads Military College ===
In 1940 HMCS Royal Roads was established as a naval training establishment for World War II reserve officers. In 1942, it transitioned into the Royal Canadian Naval College. It became a tri-service school in 1948 called the Canadian Services College Royal Roads 1968. It was formally renamed Royal Roads Military College in 1968. The military college was closed in 1995 and the estate leased to the Province of British Columbia. That same year, the castle and grounds were designated a National Historic Site of Canada. The College is named for the Royal Roads body of water, which forms the entrance into Esquimalt Harbour from the Strait of Juan de Fuca, lying to the east of the facility.

In 1995, Royal Roads University was created by legislation enacted by the Province of British Columbia. In September 1995 it was opened as a public, degree-granting university. The university leases the campus from the Department of National Defence for $1 per year. The university manages all stewardship responsibilities related to the site, including site management, operations, heritage preservation and restoration, and educating the public about the site's history and natural resources.

== Hatley Gardens ==
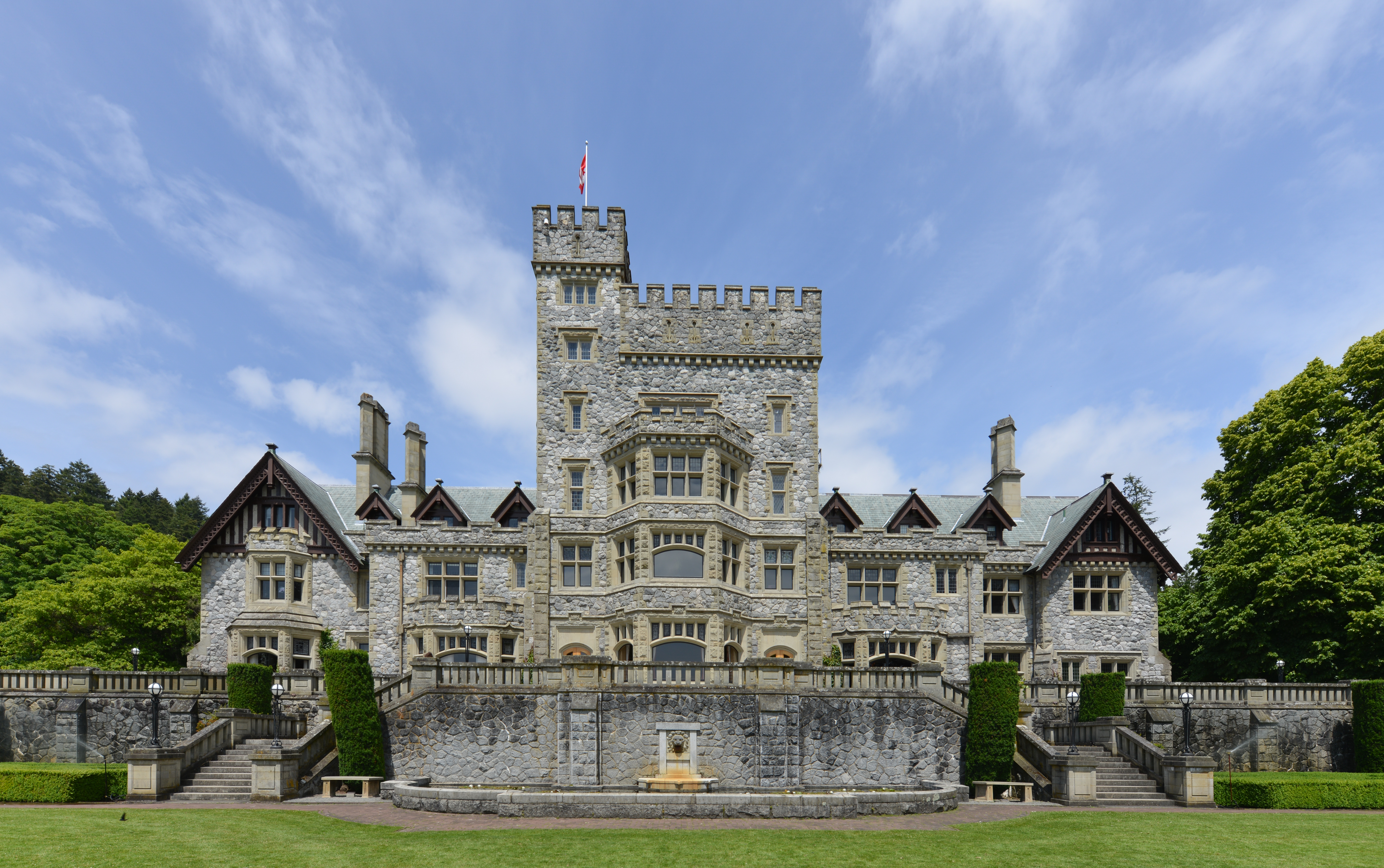
Hatley Castle, garden side

In 1912, the Dunsmuirs engaged the American landscape architects Franklin Brett and George D. Hall of Boston, students of Frederick Law Olmsted, to develop a landscape for the entire site. They prepared a classic design for an Edwardian park that included the overall layout for the entire property. The plan organized the estate into four distinct landscape zones, progressing from a series of nine formal 'garden rooms' near Hatley Castle, to recreational spaces, then to agricultural lands, and finally to the forest surrounding the estate. During the Dunsmuir era, approximately 100 gardeners and groundskeepers tended the estate. During the years when the cadets attended Royal Roads Military College, the Department of National Defence employed approximately 50 gardeners and groundskeepers to maintain the property; a testimony to their commitment to retain the integrity of the estate.

The Edwardian estate is located on southern Vancouver Island and has views of the Olympic Mountains in the U.S. The gardens are an 565-acre (2.29 km^{2}) estate, including the house's park, and are also a popular wedding location. Today, Royal Roads University employs five full-time gardeners, one arborist, a garden curator, seven seasonal gardeners and groundskeepers, and one manager. As the university does not receive any federal, provincial or municipal funding to maintain the site, the gardeners must make choices about the areas that can be best presented. They have made the Japanese, Rose and Italian gardens the showcase areas of the property.

=== Admission fees era ===
In June 2006, citing the unfunded costs of heritage preservation, the university started charging admission fees to its main heritage gardens, an area that makes up less than five per cent of the 565-acre (2.29 km^{2}) campus. This prompted some public controversy for the $12 for adults in the summer and $6 during the winter fees, which helped subsidise $550,000 yearly maintenance costs (a fee which since risen), but the garden fee only brought $40,000 a year. It also introduced a $15 four-month summer garden pass for residents of Greater Victoria, in addition to the free pass offered to residents of Colwood. As of 2019 the fee was cancelled and the gardens are free to visit.

== Use in television and film ==
Hatley parks and castle has been the venue for dozens of films and television shows for over 80 years.

- Hatley Castle is shown in the Smallville television series as Luthor Mansion, the estate belonging to Lex Luthor.
- The castle has been featured in two series of X-Men related media as Xavier's School for Gifted Youngsters.
  - The 1996 television film Generation X
  - The X-Men film series, starting from 2003's X2: X-Men United and including X-Men: The Last Stand, Deadpool, and Deadpool 2. Elements of Hatley Castle's exterior influenced the new versions of Xavier's school in X-Men: Days of Future Past, X-Men: Apocalypse, and Dark Phoenix.
- The castle is the house of Hubert, dog protagonist of The Duke.
- It was used in the 1997 film, Masterminds as Shady Glen School, supposedly a private elementary school in California.
- The castle was used in MacGyver TV series. In the second episode of season 5, "The Legend of the Holy Rose, part 2", as a hideout for the episode's villain.
- In the TV series Seven Days, episode 9 of season 2, "Love and Other Disasters", the castle is used as a home for a royal family and a place for a royal wedding.
- In the series Poltergeist: The Legacy, Hatley Castle was the headquarters of the San Francisco Legacy.
- Many scenes of Fierce People (2004) were filmed in the interior and exterior of Hatley Castle. It was used as the stately home of the rich family clan of Ogden C. Osborne.
- The ending scenes of The Changeling (1979) were filmed inside Hatley Castle.
- Big Time Movie, based on the TV series Big Time Rush, was filmed on some parts of the property for its 2011 release.
- Shown in the Arrow television series as Queen Mansion, home of Oliver Queen and his family.
- Shown in the Witches of East End television series as Home of Gardiner family.
- Shown in The Killing television series as St. George's military academy.
- Shown in the Disney movie Descendants (2015), Descendants 2 (2017), Descendants 3 (2019), Descendants: The Rise of Red (2024) and Descendants: Wicked Wonderland (2026) as Auradon Prep, the school for the children of Disney fairy tale characters.
- Shown in the TV series The Dead Zone.
- Shown in the Fox TV series Bones in the season 11 episode "The Promise in the Palace" as the Magic Palace.
- Featured in the 2018 film The Professor.
- Hosted the Starting Line of The Amazing Race Canada 6.
- The staircase is shown in the CW TV series Supernatural at the abandoned asylum in "Advanced Thanatology", the fifth episode of season 13.
- The exterior was portrayed as a luxury hotel in the 1992 film Knight Moves.

== Buildings ==
The Register of the Government of Canada Heritage Buildings lists nine recognized buildings and one classified building on the grounds of the Hatley Park National Historic Site.

| Building (Year built) | Significance |
|---|---|
| Guard House Building 38 | Recognized Federal Heritage Building 2002 |
| Belmont Road Main Gatehouse BEL 13 (1908) | Recognized Federal Heritage Building 2000 |
| Cedar Building (Building 6) (1912–1916) | Recognized Federal Heritage Building 2000 The original Tudor-style dairy and cattle barns were converted into laboratories and classrooms for physics and oceanography. The building was refurbished in 1998 into research and computer laboratories, and again in 2014 into office space for the university's IT Services department. |
| Gatehouse Lodge RR8 (1912 to 1916) | Recognized Federal Heritage Building 2000 |
| Grant Building Building 24 (1942) | main academic building, laboratories, cafeteria, and offices named for first Commanding Officer of HMCS Royal Roads, Captain John Moreau Grant. The building was recently renovated. Recognized Federal Heritage Building 1990 |
| Gymnasium - sports complex (1942) | gymnasium, weight room, fitness studio, squash courts, outdoor tennis courts *Registry of Historic Places of Canada |
| Hatley Castle (1908) | administrative centre of Royal Roads University. From 1941 until 1943 when Grant Block was completed, the Castle served as dormitory and mess hall for cadets and staff officers at RRMC. Classified Federal Heritage Building 1986 Registry of Historic Places of Canada |
| Hatley Park / Former Royal Roads Military College (1908–1913) | designated National Historic Site of Canada 1995 |
| Millward Building (Building 21) (1991) | Offices, dormitories, named for former Commandant Air Vice-Marshal James Bert Millward DFC (Bar), GdG(F), CD, RCAF 1949-52 the 4th Commandant of RRMC. Although sometimes referred to as an annex of the Nixon Building, Millward has its own building designation (21) and the floor numbers do not align with Nixon. For example, the Millward fourth floor adjoins, via fire doors, the Nixon second floor. |
| Nixon Block RR24A (1954 to 1956) | classrooms, dormitories named after the former Commanding Officer Nixon of the Royal Naval College of Canada, when it was re-established in Esquimalt, British Columbia in 1918. Recognized Federal Heritage Building 2000 |
| Sherman Jen Building (Stable / Garage) RR4 (1914) | Recognized Federal Heritage Building 2000 James Dunsmuir's stables and garage were later converted to classrooms, dormitory, social centre known as the Mews Conference Centre. In 2017 and 2018, the building was extensively renovated with a new wing of classrooms and laboratories added, and renamed in 2018 to honour Dr. Sherman Jen, whose donation to the University of $7 million partially funded the building's transformation. |
| Swimming Pool RR22A (1959) | two-storey, white concrete building composed of horizontal cubic volumes. Recognized Federal Heritage Building 2000 |

== See also ==
- Hatley Park, Greater Victoria
