= ECO Canada =

- Type: Not-for-profit organization
- Industry: Environment
- Founded: 1992; 34 years ago
- Founder: Grant Trump
- Headquarters: Calgary, Alberta
- Area served: Canada
- Website: eco.ca

ECO Canada (Environmental Careers Organization of Canada) is an online resource for environmental jobs, certification and training established in 1992 as part of Canada's sector council initiative. Sector councils are organizations that address human resource challenges facing the Canadian economy. With the support of private sector investors and the Government of Canada’s Department of Human Resources and Social Development, ECO Canada works to determine the skills and human resource needs of Canada’s environment industry.

== Background ==
ECO Canada is one of about 30 sector councils whose objectives are to:

- Implement national occupational standards for skills and training
- Promote employment opportunities via a skilled workforce
- Meet industry requirements for qualified new practitioners
- Provide labour market projections and information on environmental sector trends for governments, educators, youth, and industry planners
- Improve the dialogue between industry and the academic community
- Address labour market entry problems and school-to-work transition difficulties encountered by youth

ECO Canada provides resources including an online environmental job board, certification for environmental practitioners, a wage-subsidy internship program, environment industry-specific labour market reports, and the Environmental Employer of the Year Awards. ECO Canada also conducts research studies on human resources issues within the Canadian environmental industry. The organization publishes reports that cover topics such as HR best practices, industry compensation and labour market trends.

== Sector council program ==
ECO Canada is a member of the national sector council program. Although as diverse as the various industries, all sector councils touch upon technological advancements, human resource planning, training opportunities and industry forecasting.

== Projects ==
In 2006, ECO Canada and Royal Roads University partnered to create the Canadian Centre for Environmental Education (CCEE). The CCEE offers an environmental certificate program that takes online environmental university and college courses and combines them into one certificate. There are more than 20 universities and colleges participating by offering their courses. Some of these include Cape Breton University, University of Toronto, Red River College, Sault College, University of Victoria, Ryerson University, Royal Military College, BCIT, and Saskatchewan Polytechnic (formerly SIAST).

In May 2009, ECO Canada made available its 2009 Compensation Report. This document is Canada’s first detailed study of compensation related to key occupations in the environmental sector.

On October 1, 2009, ECO Canada announced its new national certification program for greenhouse gas (GHG) professionals. The certification was administered by ECO Canada's certification body, the Canadian Environmental Certification Approvals Board (CECAB).

== EP Certification ==
ECO Canada offers Environmental Professional (EP) Certification to Canadian professionals. This is the only nationally recognized designation for environmental practitioners with specialized knowledge. The EP Designation is designed to complement other professional designations, to become a provincially recognized signatory. ECO Canada works with provinces and territories across Canada to achieve this. To qualify for EP certification, individuals must have a recognized Canadian college diploma or university degree, or equivalent international credentials and at least five years of environmental work experience in Canada.

== BEAHR Program ==
ECO Canada’s BEAHR Indigenous training programs offer customized learning that provides accessible career development to First Nation, Métis and Inuit members. This program helps overcome barriers to employment and develop competencies needed to actively contribute to Canada’s growing environmental sector.

The courses provide introductory training to those who want to work in the environmental sector in Canada. ECO Canada’s suite of Indigenous training programs is tailored to communities to provide entry-level opportunities in the environmental field. Since 2006, ECO Canada has delivered over 270 customized BEAHR Training Programs in partnership with 220+ First Nations, Métis and Inuit communities across the country. Each delivery is customized to meet the needs and priorities of the respective communities, along with the local employment demands of that geographical area.

== Wage Funding ==
ECO Canada has many wage funding programs to help employers attract new talent while saving initial wage and training costs. Young practitioners and students are then given the opportunity to kickstart their career journey and gain meaningful work experience. ECO Canada has many funding partners that create several programs available. Each program has unique eligibility requirements for employers and job candidates. The organization has distributed over $90 million in wage and training subsidies and helped to fill 14,000 job placements.
