= Hatley Park, Greater Victoria =

Neighbourhood in Colwood, British Columbia, Canada

Coordinates: 48.431°N 123.481°W

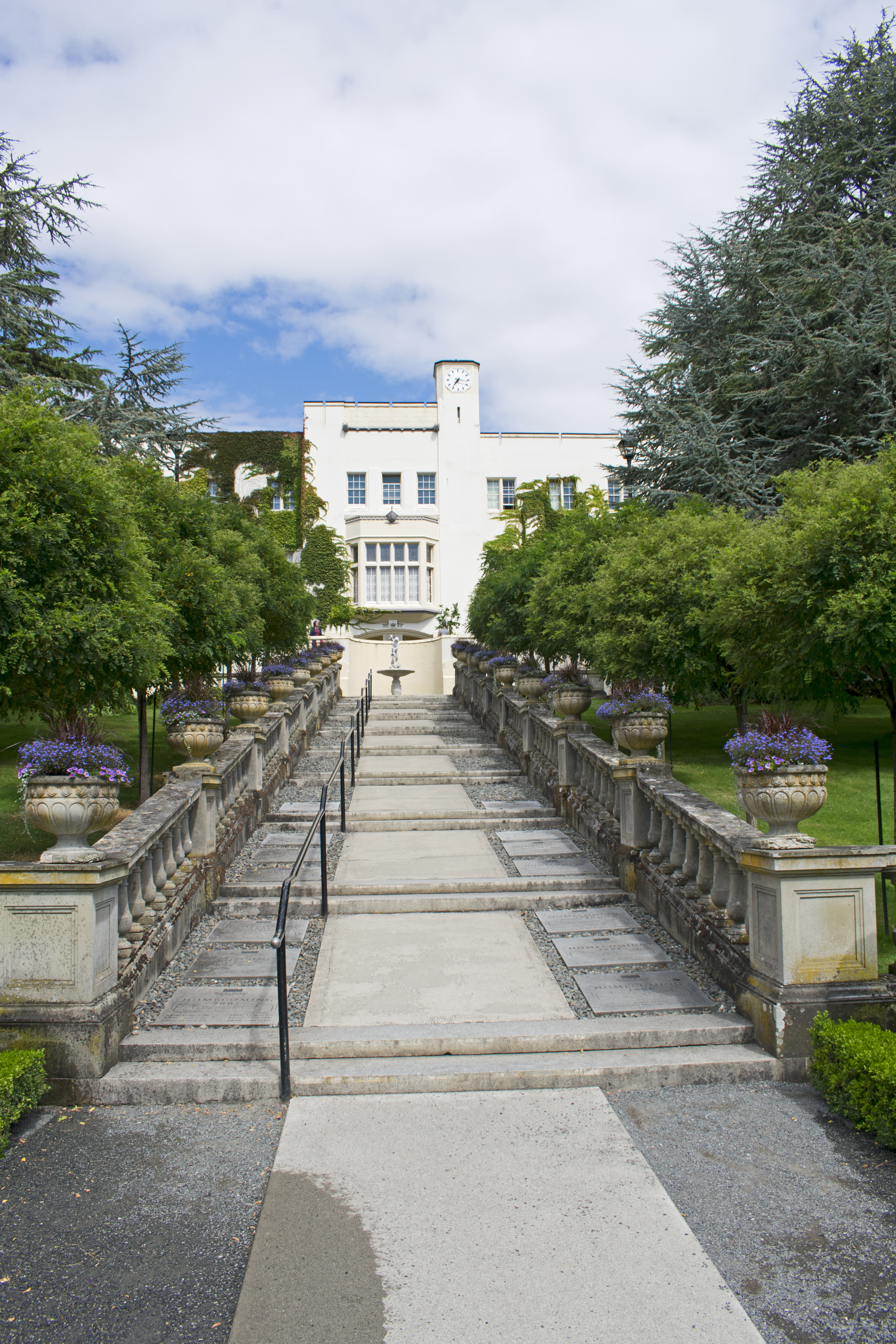
Grant Building and the staircase, Hatley Park National Historic Site

Hatley Park is a neighbourhood in Colwood, British Columbia. Named after Hatley Park National Historic Site, which contains Hatley Castle, it is the home of Royal Roads University. Another notable landmark in the area is the Hatley Memorial Gardens, a large cemetery located opposite Hatley Park National Historic Site.

The neighborhood lies between Hatley Plaza and the Hatley Memorial Gardens. While some farmland remains in the area, most has been converted to middle-class residential subdivisions and commercial establishments (mainly strip malls). The neighbourhood's major thoroughfare is Highway 14, locally known as Sooke Road.
