= Samuel Maclure =

Canadian architect

- Born: 11 April 1860; Sapperton, New Westminster, British Columbia
- Died: 8 August 1929 (aged 69)
- Education: Spring Garden Institute, Philadelphia
- Occupation: Architect
- Projects: 450+ commissions

Samuel Maclure (11 April 1860 – 8 August 1929) was a Canadian architect and artist in British Columbia, Canada, from 1890 to 1920. He was born on 11 April 1860 in Sapperton, New Westminster, British Columbia, to John and Martha Maclure. He studied painting at the Spring Garden Institute in Philadelphia from 1884 to 1885, and he was a self-taught architect. He married Margaret Catherine (Daisy) Simpson, an accomplished pianist and portrait painter, on 10 August 1889.

== Career ==
In 1889, he formed an architectural partnership in New Westminster in association with Charles H. Clow, and then with Richard P. Sharp. In 1892, Maclure moved to Victoria, British Columbia. From 1897 to 1899, he formed an architectural partnership with John Edmeston Parr in Vancouver. From 1905 to 1916, he formed an architectural partnership in Vancouver with Cecil Croker Fox.

Maclure and his wife Daisy were founding members of the Vancouver Island Arts and Crafts Society in 1909. In 1920, the Vancouver office reopened under Maclure's former apprentice, Ross A. Lort, who continued the practice after Maclure's death on 8 August 1929 in Victoria, following a prostate operation.

== Notable commissions ==
Maclure was responsible for over 450 commissions in British Columbia. His first commission, the Temple building for merchant Robert Ward, reflects the Chicago School style.

He was known for Tudorbethan architecture, the American Craftsman Style and, after 1912, Edwardian classicism. His gardens reflected the aesthetic of the English Arts and Crafts Movement. He was a consultant to the Butchart Gardens near Victoria.

According to Maclure biographer Janet Bingham, the architect is also known to have created houses in the United States, but only one is extant - Ramsay House in Ellensburg, WA - an Arts & Crafts style bungalow with Tudor finishes that has changed hands only three times since construction finished in 1905.

Name Heritage Class	Location Neighbourhood	Description	Year	Builder or Architect	Photo	Plaque
Aberthau House (previously known as Rear House),	intersection of West 2nd Avenue and Trimble Street in Vancouver, British Columbia.	This Tudor Revival house was originally a private residence and is now a community centre.	1910–1913,	Samuel Maclure, architect	Aberthau House	
Alexis Martin House	Victoria, British Columbia	This Tudor Revival house uses the shingle style and half-timber façade treatment.	1905	Samuel Maclure, architect		
Nichol House	Vancouver, British Columbia	This Tudor Revival house uses the shingle style and half-timber façade treatment.	1912-13	Samuel Maclure, architect		
Brock House (Thorley Park)	3875; Point Grey Road in Vancouver, British Columbia.	This Tudor Revival house was originally a private residence and at one time a Royal Canadian Mounted Police detachment. This is now a seniors activity centre, Brock House Society and a restaurant open to the public. Brock House Restaurant stages over 200 weddings per year. For more information see the Society's 2012 publication THORLEY PARK TO BROCK HOUSE: From Family Home to Heritage Landmark, 1912 - 2012 Jo Pleshakov, Editor	1911	Samuel Maclure, architect		
Chalmers Church	2801 Hemlock	This church is in the Tudor Revival style.	1912	Samuel Buttrey Birds, architect		
Gabriola (Angus Apartments)	1531; Davie Street in Vancouver, British Columbia.	Gabriola, was built for B.T. Rogers, founder of B.C. Sugar Refining Co. This Queen Anne grand mansion, is located in the Vancouver West End. The building became the Angus Apartments in 1925. It became a restaurant, but it is currently vacant.	1901	Samuel Maclure, architect		
Government House	Victoria, British Columbia	It was destroyed in 1957.	1900-3	Samuel Maclure, architect with Francis Mawson Rattenbury		
Hatley Castle	Colwood, British Columbia	Hatley Castle was built as a private residence in the Scottish baronial style for James Dunsmuir. It is now Hatley Park National Historic Site, the location of Royal Roads University (formerly the Royal Roads Military College).	1906–1908	Samuel Maclure, architect		
McDowell, Atkins & Watson Company Building	339 West Hastings Street. Vancouver, British Columbia.	This building was built for the McDowell, Atkins & Watson Company but is currently the Cambie Hostel.	1899	Samuel Maclure, architect and John Edmeston Parr		
Ralph Block	126 West Hastings Street in Vancouver, British Columbia.		1899	Samuel Maclure, architect and John Edmeston Parr		
Rosemeade Manor	429 Lampson Street, Victoria, British Columbia	This Tudor Revival manor was originally built for Yorkshire-born realtor and developer Thomas Harry Slater, who brought over artisans from England and Scotland to work on the project. In the early 1950s the Rosemeade was converted to the Olde English Inn. Faithful replicas of an Elizabethan street, the home of Shakespeare's birthplace and Anne Hathaway's cottage were built on the five acre property. The Rosemeade Manor is now a boutique hotel and wedding venue called The English Inn.	1906	Samuel Maclure, architect		
Temple Building	Victoria, British Columbia	This building for merchant Robert Ward reflects the Chicago School style.	1893	Samuel Maclure, architect		
Thomson Block	300 Cambie Street, Vancouver, British Columbia.		1898	Samuel Maclure, architect and John Edmeston Parr		
Tulk House Rosemary (Order of the Convent of Our Lady of the Cenacle)	3689; Selkirk Street, Vancouver, British Columbia	This Tudor Revival manor was built for whiskey baron & lawyer, Edward Tulk, who name the house after his daughter, Rosemary. It was also home to the Lieutenant Governor of B.C., John William Fordham Johnson. From 1947, the house was owned by the Order of the convent of Our Lady of the Cenacle until 1996, where it was used as a retreat.	1915	Samual Maclure & Cecil Fox, architects		
Biggerstaff Wilson Residence	1770 Rockland Avenue, Victoria, British Columbia	W. Biggerstaff Wilson commissioned Maclure to design this Elizabethan Revival manor house. Wilson was a son of William Wilson, one of the founders of W. and J. Wilson Clothiers. He reputedly received a large inheritance from a family friend because he was named after him. In 1901, he founded an ice and cold storage business. Dominated by its large hipped roof, this home is considered to be Maclure's most successful Tudor Revival design.	1905	Samuel Maclure, architect		

== Legacy ==
His paintings are found in the Art Gallery of Greater Victoria and in the Maltwood Art Museum and Gallery, University of Victoria. His architectural plans and drawings are held in the University of Victoria Architecture and Special Coll., SC075 (Samuel Maclure fonds).

== See also ==
- List of heritage buildings in Vancouver

== Bibliography ==
- Bingham, Janet (1985). Samuel Maclure, Architect. Horsdal & Schubart. ISBN 978-0-9206-6302-8.
- Eaton, Leonard K. (1971). The architecture of Samuel Maclure. Art Gallery of Greater Victoria.
- Segger, Martin; Franklin, D. (1986). The buildings of Samuel Maclure: in search of appropriate form. Sono Nis Press. ISBN 978-0-919203-76-1.
- Segger, Martin (2005). "Maclure, Samuel". In Cook, Ramsay; Bélanger, Réal (eds.). Dictionary of Canadian Biography. Vol. XV (1921–1930) (online ed.). University of Toronto Press.
- Segger, Martin (30 May 2018) [July 20, 2009]. "Samuel Maclure". The Canadian Encyclopedia (online ed.). Historica Canada.
