= Cameron Bethel Ware =

Canadian Army general (1913–1999)

- Born: August 9, 1913; London, Ontario, Canada
- Died: January 21, 1999 (aged 85)
- Allegiance: Canada
- Branch: Canadian Forces
- Service years: 1935–1977
- Rank: Major General
- Commands: HMCS Royal Roads /Royal Roads Military College
- Awards: DSO, CD

Major General Cameron Bethel Ware, DSO, CD, (August 9, 1913 – January 21, 1999) was a major general in the Canadian Forces. He joined the Princess Patricia's Canadian Light Infantry Regiment on graduation from RMC in Kingston, Ontario, in 1935 (student #2253).

== Career ==
On the outbreak of war in 1939, he was serving on attachment to the British Army. He rejoined Princess Patricia's Canadian Light Infantry in 1940 as a major and was appointed second in command in 1941. He led the battalion in the invasion of Italy and in all operations up to the end of the Battle of Liri Valley in June 1944. On leaving the Princess Patricia's Canadian Light Infantry he was promoted to colonel and was given command of the regiment at Camp MacDonald. In September, 1947, he proceeded to staff college and thereafter received a senior staff appointment. On the outbreak of the Korean War he took command of the Canadian Military Mission to the Far East. In 1952, he became Director General of Military training. In 1952, he was appointed commandant of the Services College at Royal Roads Military College. In 1955, he became Director General of Military Training. He was then appointed commander, 1 Canadian Infantry Brigade Group in Germany. Promoted to major-general in 1962, he was appointed commandant, National Defence College in Kingston, Ontario in 1966 until his retirement. Major-General Ware was appointed colonel of the regiment, Princess Patricia's Canadian Light Infantry on 13 September 1959. He retired from the Canadian Forces in September, 1966. Major-General Ware relinquished the appointment of colonel of the regiment on 21 April 1977. Major General Ware died 21 January 1999.

== Honours ==
He was Mentioned in Despatches 30 October 1943 and awarded the DSO during the battle of the Moro River 5 December 1943.

== Legacy ==
The Major General Cameron Bethel Ware fonds are in the Princess Patricia's Canadian Light Infantry Regimental Museum and Archives.

Academic offices
Preceded by Air Vice Marshal James Bert Millward	Commandant of the Royal Roads Military College; 1952-1954	Succeeded by Captain John A. Charles
