= John Moreau Grant =

Canadian naval officer (1895–1986)

- Born: 1895; Halifax, Nova Scotia, Canada
- Died: 1986 (aged 90–91)
- Allegiance: Canada
- Branch: Canadian Forces Royal Canadian Navy
- Service years: 1911–1946
- Rank: Captain
- Commands: HMCS Royal Roads /Royal Roads Military College
- Awards: CBE

Captain John Moreau Grant CBE (1895 – 1986) was a Canadian naval officer. He was the first Commanding Officer of HMCS Royal Roads in Esquimalt, British Columbia. The Grant Building at Royal Roads University was named in his honour.

== Education ==
John Moreau Grant was born in 1895 in Halifax, Nova Scotia. His father was the 11th Lieutenant Governor of Nova Scotia MacCallum Grant. One of his 5 brothers (also 1 sister) was Harold Taylor Wood Grant. He spent two years at school in Heidelberg, Germany. He returned to Halifax in 1909. In January 1911, he joined the Royal Naval College of Canada as one of a class of twenty-one cadets. He entered a strenuous regime conducted by Royal Navy instructors with a heavy emphasis on engineering subjects. He graduated as a midshipman in 1913.

== Naval Service ==
He joined the cruiser HMS Berwick, and sailed for the West Indies for training. In Mexico and Venezuela, he was part of a force sent to protect British interests against revolutionaries. After courses at Halifax, Nova Scotia he joined another cruiser, HMS Suffolk, which patrolled off the eastern seaboard of the United States where she stopped shipping to search for German nationals of military age, who were removed. Since he spoke German, he was always a member of the boarding party. He was also involved in the escort of troopships to England. He was appointed to HMS Beaver, an I-class destroyer. He was constantly at sea, patrolling to the Hook of Holland. He escorted hospital ships to and from France. He employed anti-submarine and minesweeping methods. Asdic, depth charges, and the hydrophones used in the Great War could not be used when a ship was underway, however they were used in action against enemy submarines. He was ordered to the Mediterranean Sea in April 1918. He performed convoy, anti-submarine, and rescue work. He found that social and sports activities ashore were much improved. At Brindisi, Italy, efforts made to seal the Adriatic against movement of enemy submarines were only partially effective, since the sea was too deep to blockade. He served as the Executive Officer of HMS Beaver. He ferried troops to the Dardanelles when Turkey surrendered. He entered the Sea of Marmara and proceeded to Constantinople. In October 1918, he participated in the bombardment of Durazzo, Albania. From Constantinople they sailed to Odessa, Russia where the German army and the White Russians were attempting to keep some sort of civil order. Welcomed by the Rumanians, they sailed up the Danube where they attempted to keep the Rumanians and Bulgarians apart. In December 1918, he called at Sevastopol, Russia where he saw and visited the Russian Black Sea Fleet, which was largely abandoned and in a poor state of repair. He removed a number of political refugees from Odessa, Russia.

== Royal Canadian Naval College HMCS Royal Roads ==
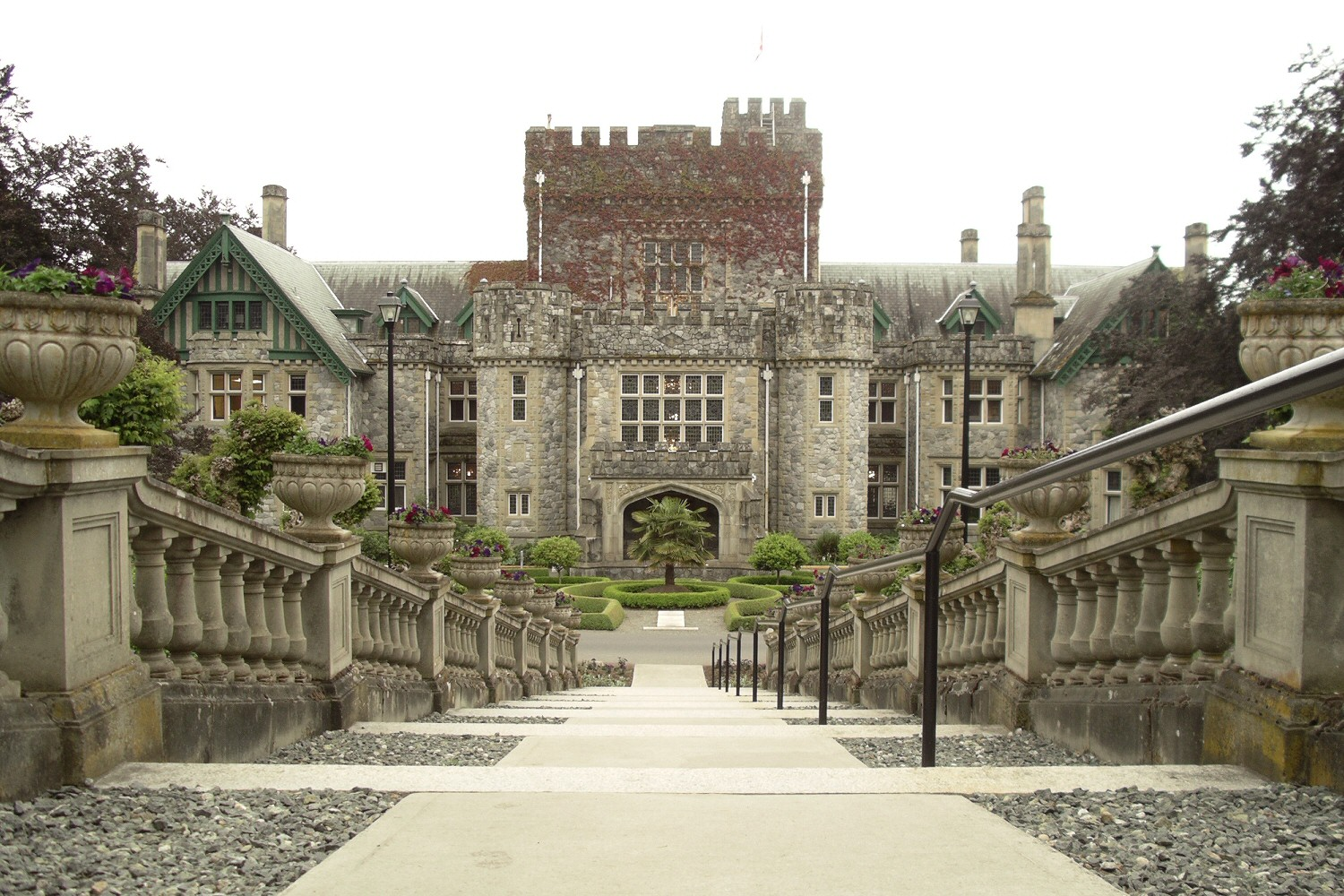
Hatley Castle

After the Royal Naval College of Canada closed in 1931, the practice of sending Canadian naval officers to England for training was found to be expensive and unreliable. In 1940, Rear Admiral Percy W. Nelles, then chief of naval staff, led a group of RNCC alumni who met with Angus Lewis Macdonald, then naval minister to discuss opening a college to train naval officers for the postwar navy and for civilian employment in the merchant marine. The college was to be similar to the Royal Naval College at Dartmouth and to the former RNCC. In 1940, Angus Lewis Macdonald explained to the House of Commons "it will be a proud day for this country, when our Canadian naval effort will be directed by Canadian men, trained in Canada and operating in ships built in this country." In November 1940, the Hatley Park and grounds was purchased by the Royal Canadian Navy for $75,000 to house a Naval Training Establishment. Captain Grant was appointed the first commandant of the Royal Canadian Naval College HMCS Royal Roads from 1940 to 1944. From 13 December 1940 to October 1942, HMCS Royal Roads operated as an Officer Training Establishment for short-term probationary RCNVR sub-lieutenants. Royal Roads trained cadets for the executive branch, the engineer branch and the accountant branch of the Royal Canadian Navy. He later served as the Executive Officer of the Royal Military College of Canada in Kingston, Ontario. Grant died in 1986.

== Honours ==
Grant was appointed a Commander of the Order of the British Empire.

The Grant Building which is the main academic building, laboratories, cafeteria, and offices at the Royal Roads Military College (later Royal Roads University) was named for Captain Grant. The building, which is on the Registry of Historic Places of Canada, was recently renovated.

The National Portrait Gallery in Ottawa, Ontario holds a portrait of Captain John Moreau Grant.

Academic offices
Preceded by {{{before}}}	Commandant of the Royal Canadian Naval College; 1942-4	Succeeded by Captain(N) Creery

Academic offices
Preceded by {{{before}}}	Commandant of HMCS Royal Roads; 1940-2	Succeeded by {{{after}}}
