= Royal Roads =

Anchorage in British Columbia, Canada

Coordinates: 48.410°N 123.46°W

Royal Roads is a roadstead or anchorage located in Strait of Juan de Fuca near the entrance to Esquimalt Harbour in Greater Victoria, British Columbia, Canada.

== History ==
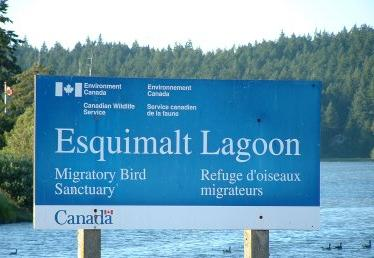
Esquimalt Lagoon Sign, Colwood, British Columbia

In 1790, Sub-Lt Don Manuel Quimper of the Spanish navy anchored his ship Princess Royal there and claimed the territory for Carlos IV. He called the roads Rada de Valdes y Bazan. Royal Roads was given the name Royal Bay by Captain Henry Kellett of the British survey ship HMS Herald. An 1861 map of Victoria by Joseph Despard Pemberton shows Royal Roads labelled "Royal Bay". Walbran describes "Roads" as an "area frequented by shipping, being a convenient and free rendezvous for vessels seeking freight or waiting orders."

Esquimalt Lagoon is a beach and wildlife preserve with a view of Hatley Castle, Royal Roads University in the background. A small plaque on a concrete cairn in the shore of the Esquimalt Lagoon outlines its history. "Royal Roads - To seaward lies an anchorage or roadstead first used in 1790 by the Spanish and named in 1846 for its location between Albert Head and Victoria. Unloading place for large vessels serving Victoria in days of sail, it was once a scene of disaster. On April 1, 1883 a southeasterly gale swept the haven, beaching the ships Southern Chief, Gettysburg, Connaught and Tiger. Province of British Columbia. Erected by the Thermopylae Club 1973."
