= Canadian Centre for Environmental Education =

The Canadian Centre for Environmental Education (CCEE) is a Canadian educational organization focused on environmental courses. It was created in 2005 through a unique collaborative approach involving 25 major universities and colleges across Canada. The 25 institutions offer their distance-based environmental courses as part of a joint certificate program. Utilizing online distance learning through Royal Roads University, the CCEE's Certificate in Environmental Practice (CEP) is used as a form of professional development, continuing education, and skills transitioning for individuals interested in, or currently working within, the environmental industry. Eleven concentrations are offered within the certificate, aligning with the Canadian National Occupational Standards for Environmental Employment.

== Background ==
The CCEE was established to address the challenges of the environmental labour market. The overall growth in the demand for employment in the environmental industry exceeds the demand for employment in all other industries in Canada. The goal of the CCEE is to decrease the gap between the demand for qualified employees and the supply of employees with relevant expertise.

The two organizations responsible for creating the CCEE are ECO Canada, and Royal Roads University.

It was designed in accordance with the National Occupational Standards for Environmental Employment. National Occupational Standards refer to relevant competencies identified by industry experts as necessary for a particular occupation. Credentials are granted to students through courses and/or a Prior Learning Assessment and Recognition tool (Recognition of Prior Learning).

Startup funding for the initiative was provided by the Government of Canada.

A major objective of the partnership is to facilitate a process that will help transition practitioners from other fields of specialization into the environmental sector. Sector transitioning initiatives are increasing in Canada in an effort to ensure a sufficient supply of qualified practitioners in growth sectors such as the environment and also assist employees in declining sectors looking for work.

== Partners ==
- Algonquin College
- Athabasca University
- BCIT
- Cambrian College
- Cape Breton University
- Durham College
- Loyalist College
- Malaspina University College
- Red River College
- Royal Military College
- Royal Roads University
- SAIT Polytechnic
- Sault College
- SIAST
- Simon Fraser University
- TELUQ
- Thompson Rivers University
- Toronto Metropolitan University
- University of British Columbia
- University of Guelph
- University of New Brunswick
- University of Northern BC
- University of Toronto
- University of Victoria
- Wilfrid Laurier University
