= HMS Beaver (1911) =

Destroyer of the Royal Navy

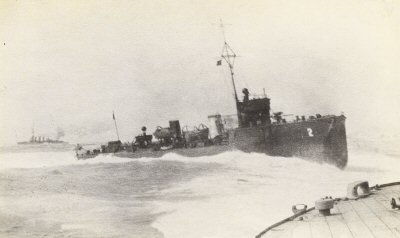
- HMS Beaver, probably pre-First World War, in black paint and without a pennant number

History

United Kingdom
- Name: HMS Beaver
- Builder: William Denny & Brothers, Dumbarton
- Yard number: 934
- Laid down: 6 October 1910
- Launched: 6 October 1911
- Commissioned: November 1912
- Fate: Sold 9 May 1921

General characteristics
- Class & type: Acheron-class destroyer
- Displacement: 990 tons
- Length: 75 m (246 ft)
- Beam: 7.8 m (26 ft)
- Draught: 2.7 m (8.9 ft)
- Installed power: 13,500 shp (10,100 kW)
- Propulsion: 3 × Parsons turbines; 3 × oil-fired Yarrow boilers; 3 × shafts
- Speed: 27 kn (50 km/h)
- Complement: 70
- Armament: 2 × BL 4-inch (101.6 mm) L/40 Mark VIII guns, mounting P Mark V; 2 × QF 12-pounder 12 cwt naval gun, mounting P Mark I; 2 × single tubes for 21 inch (533 mm) torpedoes

HMS Beaver was an Acheron-class destroyer of the Royal Navy that served during the First World War and was sold for breaking in 1921. She was the ninth Royal Navy ship to be named Beaver, after the mammal of the same name.

== Construction ==
She was ordered under the 1910-11 shipbuilding programme from Parsons, with construction subcontracted to William Denny & Brothers of Dumbarton. Beaver was laid down on 18 October 1910, was launched on 6 October 1911 and commissioned in November 1912. She and her sister-ship Badger were completed with geared steam turbines for evaluation purposes and were known as "Parsons Specials".

== Pennant numbers ==
Pennant number	From	To
H17	6 December 1914	22 February 1915
H77	22 February 1915	1 September 1915
H66	1 September 1915	1 January 1918
H20	1 January 1918	Early 1919
H07	Early 1919	9 May 1921

== Operational history ==
=== Pre-war ===
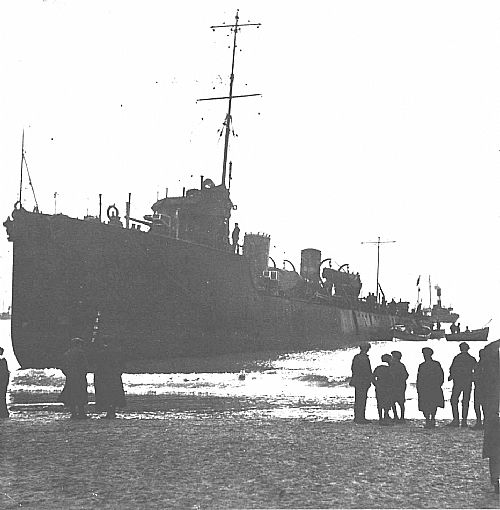
Beaver stranded at Great Yarmouth in December 1912

Beaver served with the First Destroyer Flotilla from 1911. She was stranded at Great Yarmouth in December 1912, but was not badly damaged. With her flotilla, she joined the British Grand Fleet in 1914 on the outbreak of the First World War.

=== The Battle of Heligoland Bight ===
She was present on 28 August 1914 at the Battle of Heligoland Bight, detached from the First Destroyer Flotilla along with Jackal, Badger and Sandfly. She shared in the prize money for the engagement.

=== Home Waters service ===
During the War, the Canadian John Moreau Grant (later the first commanding officer of HMCS Royal Roads) served in Beaver, eventually becoming her first lieutenant. Beaver was employed in patrolling the English Channel as far as the Hook of Holland, and escorted hospital ships to and from France. Grant's oral testimony reports an action against an unknown submarine during this period.

=== Mediterranean service ===
In April 1918 she was ordered to the Mediterranean, where she was employed in convoy and anti-submarine work. Based at Brindisi, Italy, she participated in the attempted blockade of Austro-Hungarian submarines in the Adriatic. In October 1918 she took part in the bombardment of Durazzo (now Durrës, Albania). When the Ottoman Empire signed the Armistice of Mudros on 30 October 1918, Beaver ferried troops to the Dardanelles and entered the Sea of Marmara before proceeding to Constantinople. From Constantinople, she sailed to Odessa, where civil order was breaking down amidst occupation by both the Imperial German army and the White Russian Army. She sailed up the Danube and in December 1918 visited Sevastopol, where the Russian Black Sea Fleet lay abandoned and in a poor state of repair. Some political refugees were rescued from Odessa.

== Decommissioning and fate ==
In common with most of her class, she was laid up after the First World War and, in May 1921, she was sold for breaking.
