= Federal Heritage Buildings Review Office =

Canadian government agency

The Federal Heritage Buildings Review Office (FHBRO) was established in 1982 after the Government of Canada adopted an internal policy on managing heritage buildings. Today, federal heritage is incorporated into the Government of Canada's Treasury Board Policy on the Management of Federal Real Property.

== History ==
The FHBRO was partly created because the federal government did not have heritage protection in place, while provincial jurisdictions had passed stronger heritage laws in the mid-1970s. Led by Parks Canada and a parliamentary committee on heritage, a policy was drafted and approved by cabinet in 1982. Cabinet allocated funds from Parks Canada's budget to manage FHBRO. A pioneering evaluation system was developed by leading heritage conservation architect, Hal Kalman.

Since 1982, approximately 3% of the federal government's inventory of buildings are protected by the policy (over 1300 buildings). The majority of federal heritage buildings are owned by Parks Canada, but significant holdings are managed by the Department of National Defence, Public Works and Government Services Canada and the Department of Fisheries and Oceans.

In recent years, FHBRO has been a key player in facilitating the protection and conservation of the country's most prominent buildings on Parliament Hill in Ottawa.

== Federal heritage buildings ==
Federal government policy requires that all buildings which meet the following criteria must be submitted to FHBRO for evaluation:

1. the building is 40 years of age or older (federal departments may make special evaluation requests for buildings that are less than 40 years old, but are not required to do so);
2. the building is owned, or being considered for purchase, by a federal department (excludes crown corporations); and
3. the building can contain or shelter human activities, has an interior space, an exterior shell and a roof, and it is fixed in a permanent specific location (excludes, in particular, archaeological resources and ruins).

Buildings are evaluated using a point system on the basis of historical associations, architectural value and the building's environment (site, setting and landmark status). There are two classes of Federal Heritage Building: Classified Federal Heritage Building (a score of between 75 and 135 points, out of a total of 135) and Recognized Federal Heritage Building (a score of between 50 and 74 points). Once a building has been designated a Federal Heritage Building, custodial departments are required to:

- consult FHBRO before undertaking any intervention that could alter the heritage character of a Classified Federal Building;
- obtain appropriate conservation advice before undertaking an intervention that could alter the heritage character of a Recognized Federal Building; and
- consult FHBRO before demolishing, dismantling or selling any Federal Heritage Building.
