= Royal Roads University =

Public university in Canada

- Motto: HUĆIST TŦE S,HELI ŁTE.
- Motto in English: "Living Our Learning"
- Type: Public university
- Established: 1995; 31 years ago
- Affiliations: AUCC, IAU, CVU
- Endowment: $40 million
- Chancellor: Lori Wanamaker
- President: Philip Steenkamp
- Faculty: 52 full-time, plus 450 associate faculty
- Students: 2,000 (2024–25 FTE)
- Undergraduates: 765
- Postgraduates: 3,405
- Location: Colwood, British Columbia, Canada; 48°26′04″N 123°28′22″W
- Campus: Urban
- Colours: White & blue
- Website: www.royalroads.ca

Royal Roads University (also referred to as RRU or Royal Roads) is a public university with its main campus in Colwood, British Columbia, Canada. The university is located at Hatley Park National Historic Site on Vancouver Island and is the successor to the Royal Roads Military College (RRMC), which was originally a training base for naval officers and later Canadian Air Force and Army personnel. After the end of the Cold War, the college was decommissioned, however, it was reinstituted following negotiations between the Department of National Defence and the Government of British Columbia by which the Royal Roads University Act was passed, leading to the establishment of Royal Roads University in June 1995.

The campus covers approximately 260 hectares of leased property on the grounds of Hatley Castle, which was designed by architect Samuel Maclure in the early twentieth century for British Columbia politician and coal magnate James Dunsmuir and his family. Royal Roads is a small-scale university offering over 70 programs ranging from certificates and diplomas to undergraduate and graduate degrees. RRU currently has an enrolment of around 4,100 undergraduate and postgraduate students, as well as a network of over 34,000 alumni from both the current university and the former military college.

== History ==
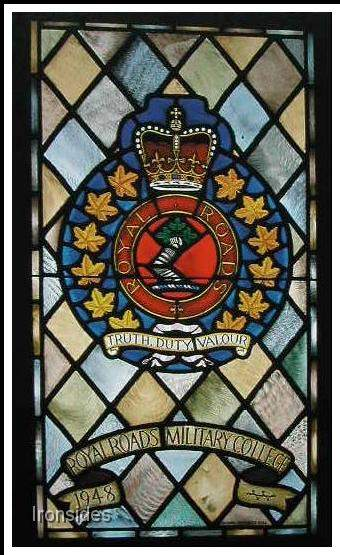
Royal Roads Military College stained glass window

The university's main building, Hatley Castle, is a Scottish baronial style mansion that was completed in 1908 for James Dunsmuir, who was then the Lieutenant Governor of British Columbia and previously the province's Premier from 1900 to 1902. At the outbreak of World War II, plans were made for King George VI, his wife Queen Elizabeth, and their two daughters, Princesses Elizabeth and Margaret, to reside in Canada. Hatley Castle was purchased by the federal government in 1940 for use as the King's royal palace, but it was decided that having the Royal Family leave the UK at a time of war would be too big a blow to morale, and the family stayed in London.

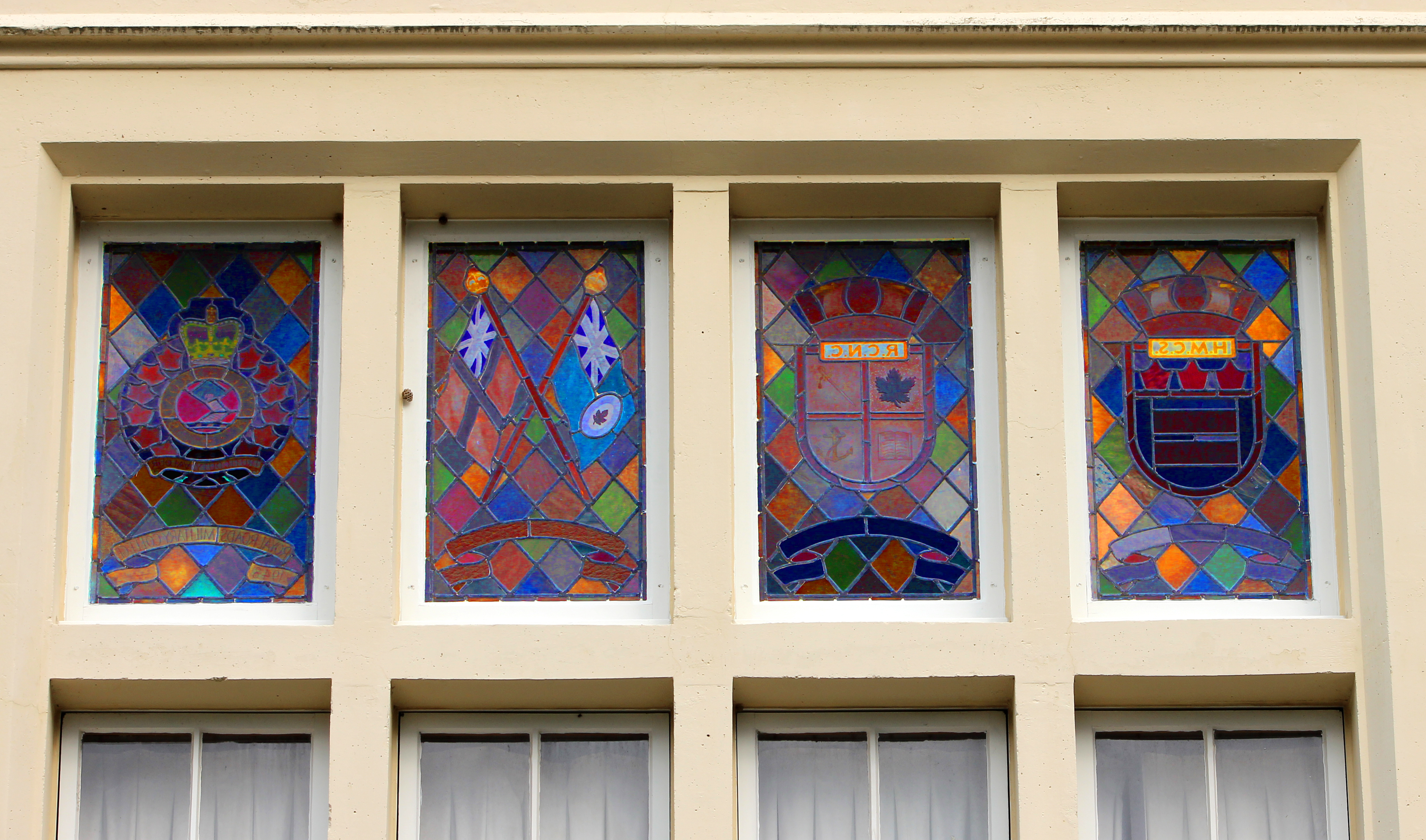
Royal Roads Military College stained-glass window

After the death of Dunsmuir and then his widow Laura, the family sold the estate to the federal government in 1940 to be used by the Canadian military. The facility was named HMCS Royal Roads and commissioned in December 1940 to train reserve officers for service in World War II. The institution went through several name changes before it eventually became Royal Roads Military College in 1968 (achieving full degree-granting status in 1975). The college's name refers to an anchorage located in Juan de Fuca Strait between the city of Victoria, British Columbia and Alert Bay.

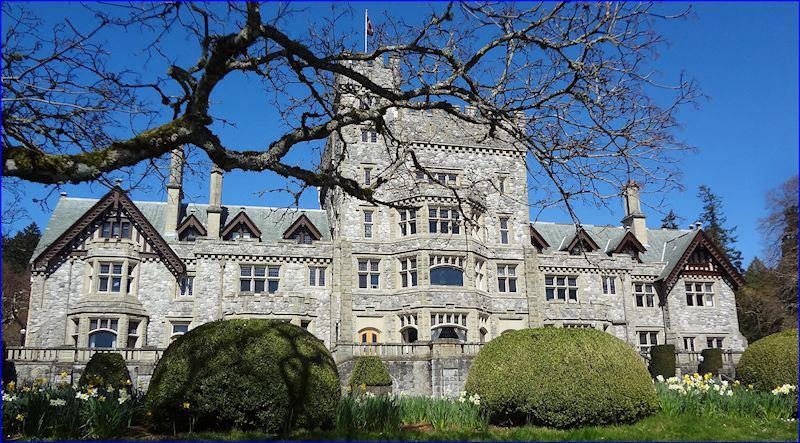
Hatley Castle

Petty Officer First Class Gabby R. Bruner, Royal Roads bandmaster from 1979 to 1985, composed "Hatley Park" as the official quick march for RRMC and "Dunsmuir Castle" for the visit of Queen Elizabeth II to Royal Roads in 1983.

When the military college was decommissioned, many of the academic staff stayed on. The historic buildings of the military college, and the extensive gardens, which were part of the estate of the Dunsmuir's, continue to be a centrepiece of the campus. Hatley Castle, the former residence of the Dunsmuir family, houses a small Canadian Military museum. In 1995, Hatley Park and former Royal Roads Military College was declared a National Historic Site of Canada to commemorate the Dunsmuir family (1908–1937) and RRMC (1940–1995). The site was designated with a plaque in 2000 as an example of a well-preserved Edwardian park with gardens.

In June 1995, Royal Roads University became a public degree-granting university. A replica of Horatio Nelson's quote, "Duty is the great business of a sea officer: All private considerations must give way to it however painful it is", which hung over the entrance to the Grant Building, was returned to Royal Roads University's campus for Homecoming in 2011.

== Royal Roads University Museum ==
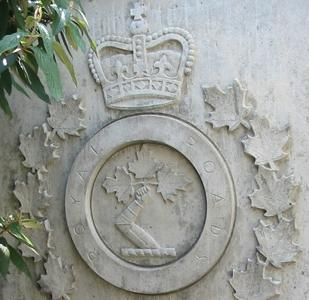
Royal Roads Military College carving

The museum is located in the lower level of Hatley Castle, on the campus of the Royal Roads University and former campus of the Royal Roads Military College. The museum's mandate is to collect, conserve, research, and display material relating to the history of the Royal Roads Military College, its former cadets and its site.

The Royal Roads Military College Museum is a member of the Canadian Museums Association and the Organization of Military Museums of Canada. The Royal Roads Museum is an accredited museum within the Canadian Forces Museum System. The museum has formed a cooperating association of friends of the museum to assist with projects. The museum is not open to the public.

== Academics ==
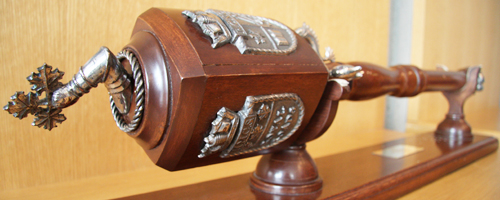
Royal Roads Military College mace at Royal Roads University

Royal Roads University offers applied and professional programs at the undergraduate, graduate, and doctorate levels, focusing on graduate level career development, with some on-campus undergraduate programs being offered as full-time accelerated. General studies and continuing education classes are also offered for non-degree or diploma seeking students. The programs are generally flexible, modelled as a blended format that combines periodic in-person sessions with online courses. This format is designed to favour working professionals, who may complete the programs at a distance while maintaining their career and other personal commitments. The university offers three formats: i) on-site with 100% face-to-face learning, ii) blended, with part of the program taught in-person and the rest online; and iii) completely online or through correspondence. Residency-based programs range from one to three weeks, and are often held on campus, but select programs may host their residencies in unique locations around the world. Mature students are welcome, and assessments of prior experience are available for transfer credit in the relevant subject area. The Royal Roads University Student Association represents undergraduate students at the university.

Royal Roads University is an active member of the University of the Arctic. UArctic is an international cooperative network based in the Circumpolar Arctic region, consisting of more than 200 universities, colleges, and other organizations with an interest in promoting education and research in the Arctic region.

== Campus and grounds ==
The campus and surrounding grounds of Royal Roads University are situated at Hatley Park National Historic Site in Colwood, British Columbia. Royal Roads leases the land from the Department of National Defence for $1 per year and assumes all stewardship responsibilities related to the site including the cost of site management, operations, the protection, preservation, and restoration of heritage assets, which include all buildings, gardens, and other historic and natural features on the site.

Name	Address	Coordinates	Government recognition (CRHP №)	Wikidata ID	Image
Belmont Road Main Gatehouse BEL 13 (1908), Royal Roads University formerly Royal Roads Military College	Hatley Park National Historic Site; Recognized Federal Heritage Building in 2000. BC	48°26′13″N 123°27′40″W	Federal (2840)		Upload Photo
CEDAR RR6 (1912–16)	Hatley Park National Historic Site; Recognized Federal Heritage Building 2000; The original Tudor-style dairy and cattle barns were converted into laboratories and classrooms for physics and oceanography. The building was refurbished in 1998 into include research and computer laboratories, and renovated again in 2014 and 2015 to house the university's IT Services department. BC	48°25′49″N 123°28′52″W	Federal (2841)		Upload Photo
Grant Block, Building 24 (1942) Royal Roads University formerly Royal Roads Military College	Hatley Park National Historic Site; main academic building, laboratories, cafeteria, and offices named for first Commanding Officer of HMCS Royal Roads, Captain John Moreau Grant. The building was recently renovated. Recognized Federal Heritage Building in 1990. BC	48°26′07″N 123°28′24″W	Federal (3664)		
Gymnasium RR22, - sports complex (1942) Royal Roads University formerly Royal Roads Military College	Hatley Park National Historic Site includes gymnasium, weight room, fitness studio, squash courts, outdoor tennis courts, and other amenities. BC	48°25′56″N 123°28′42″W	Federal (2844)		Upload Photo
Hatley Park National Historic Site (1908)/ Former Royal Roads Military College/Royal Roads University	2005 Sooke Road; administrative centre of Royal Roads University. From 1941 until 1943 when Grant Block was completed, the Castle served as dormitory and mess hall for cadets and staff officers at RRMC. Classified Federal Heritage Building 1986, Registry of Historic Places of Canada. BC	48°26′04″N 123°28′22″W	Federal (15749)		
Nixon Block RR24A (1954 to 1956) Royal Roads University formerly Royal Roads Military College	Hatley Park National Historic Site classrooms, dormitories named after the former LCdr. Edward Atcherley Eckersall Nixon, Royal Navy (RN), Commandant of Royal Naval College of Canada 1911–22, in particular when it was re-established in Esquimalt, British Columbia in 1918. Recognized Federal Heritage Building in 2000. BC	48°26′06″N 123°28′28″W	Federal (2843)		Upload Photo
Stable / Garage RR4 (1914) Royal Roads University formerly Royal Roads Military College	Hatley Park National Historic Site; Recognized Federal Heritage Building in 2000. BC	48°25′52″N 123°28′43″W	Federal (2842)		Upload Photo
Swimming Pool RR22A (1959) Royal Roads University formerly Royal Roads Military College	Hatley Park National Historic Site; two-storey, white concrete building composed of horizontal cubic volumes. Recognized Federal Heritage Building in 2000. BC	48°25′54″N 123°28′43″W	Federal (2845)		Upload Photo
Warrant Officer's Quarters Royal Roads University formerly Royal Roads Military College	Hatley Park National Historic Site; BC	48°25′57″N 123°27′08″W	Federal (4277)		Upload Photo

== Other buildings ==
Building (Year built)	Significance	Photo
Arbutus Building	Academic classrooms, administrative offices, a computer lab, and a canteen	
Boat House (1989)	Boat house	
Coronel Memorial Library	Main library named in honour of the Battle of Coronel, in which four young Canadians died.	
Dock (1990)	dock	
Guard House Building 38	Recognized Federal Heritage Building in 2002	
Gatehouse Lodge RR8 (1912 to 1916)	Recognized Federal Heritage Building in 2000	
Hatley Park / Former Royal Roads Military College (1908–13)	Designated National Historic Site of Canada in 1995	
Learning and Innovation Centre (2010–2011)	First building constructed on campus since the transition from military college to university. With 33 breakout rooms, seven classrooms, five computer labs and social spaces, the building spans 5,781 square metres over four floors.	
Sherman Jen Building, formerly Mews Conference Centre (1912)	James Dunsmuir's stables and garage later converted to classrooms, dormitory, social centre and conference centre. Registered Federal Heritage Building Extensively renovated with a new wing of classrooms and laboratories added in 2017 and 2018, the building was renamed in 2018 to honour Sherman Jen, whose donation to the University of $7 million partially funded the building's transformation.	
Millward Wing (of the Nixon Building) (1991)	Offices, dormitories, named for former Commandant Air Vice-Marshal James Bert Millward DFC (Bar), GdG(F), CD, RCAF 1949-52 the 4th Commandant of RRMC.	

The grounds, a mix of landscaped gardens and natural woodland, still go by the name of Hatley Park that the Dunsmuir family gave their estate (although it is not a designated park). Hatley Castle and its surroundings have made appearances in numerous movies and TV series programs such as Smallville where it serves as the Luthor Mansion, and the second and third X-Men films where the university is transformed into Professor Xavier's School for Gifted Youngsters.

Visitors to the 565-acre (229 ha) Hatley Park can tour the extensive walking trails, as well as the Hatley Castle museum. The museum is free to enter, and contains historic, local memorabilia as well as a gift shop. Tours of the castle itself are available (schedule is seasonal) and access to the heritage gardens (approx 20 acres) have a visitor fee that helps offset the cost of preserving the site.

In a visit to the university in August 2009, Prime Minister Stephen Harper stated: "There is surely no more beautiful campus in Canada than Lord Dunsmuir’s magnificent castle and the majestic forest and gardens of the Hatley Park National Historic Site. But beneath the Edwardian grandeur of Royal Roads lies a cutting-edge modern university".

During the life of the college, the HMCS Royal Roads Bell was displayed in the porte-cochere of Hatley Castle. After the closing of Royal Roads Military College, the HMCS Royal Roads Bell was kept in the Museum at CFB Esquimalt. It was officially repatriated on 10 Sep 2010 during the Royal Roads University 2010 Homecoming.

== Rankings ==
Based on the 2011 National Survey of Student Engagement (NSSE), Royal Roads University was ranked as the 1st public institution for an active and collaborative learning experience and for level of academic challenge.

In 2008, The Globe and Mail's Canadian University Report gave Royal Roads grades in particular categories along with 55 other universities. The grades are based on the Globe and Mail student satisfaction survey. Royal Roads was one of the 14 universities in the under 4000 students assessment pool and received a grade of B−.

=== Business school ranking ===
The BCom and MBA programs at Royal Roads were ranked by Corporate Knights Magazine in July 2007. The Royal Roads BCom program placed 28th out of the 47 BCom programs in Canada. The MBA placed 20th out of 35 MBA programs. In 2008, Corporate Knights Magazine dropped the Bcom ranking from 28th to 36th out of 47 BCom programs in the country. The MBA program dropped from 20th to 31st with the assessment pool for the ranking growing from 35 to 38 MBA programs. In 2009, Corporate Knights Magazine ranked the Bcom 25th overall out of 47 universities and 4th in the Small Sized Business School category. The MBA ranked 22 overall out of 35 universities and 4th in the Small Sized Business School category. Corporate Knights magazine bases its rankings on "the integration of environmental and social issues into university and college programmes."

== Notable alumni ==
- Jean-Yves Forcier, Commander Maritime Forces Pacific, Commander Canada Command, currently Head of Program for the Master of Arts in Disaster and Emergency Management at Royal Roads
- Jasbir Sandhu, former Canadian politician
- Jon Reyes, Canadian politician and member of the Progressive Conservative Party of Manitoba
- Kellie Garrett, Executive Coach, Speaker and Consultant; former Senior Vice President of Farm Credit Canada; named Fellow of International Association of Business Communicators in 2015
- Nicole Oliver, Canadian actress
- Dan Pontefract, Canadian business writer
- David Hamilton, Deputy Minister of the Legislative Assembly and Chief Electoral Officer of the Northwest Territories
- Jim Kyte, former NHL player and Chair of the Business School at Algonquin College
- Hugh MacDonald, former VP Strategic Alliance Management at CIBC; currently owner of HR Macdonald Training and Development, Inc.
- Laurel Collins, Canadian politician and Member of Parliament in Victoria, BC
- Peter Robinson, CEO of the David Suzuki Foundation and former CEO of Mountain Equipment Co-op
- Mitzi Dean, Canadian politician and member of the New Democratic Party of British Columbia
- Doug Stables, President of Bluewater Technologies Corporation
- Jennifer Walinga, Olympic Gold Medalist and World Champion in rowing
- Kelly Williams, Director of Maritime Strategy for the Department of National Defense
- Charles Bourdeleau, former Canadian deputy chief and chief of police for the city of Ottawa
- Chris Hadfield, Canadian astronaut
- Vernon White, Canadian senator

== Media appearances ==
The Royal Roads campus has been used as a location for filming TV shows and movies, including The Changeling, the X-Men movies X2 and X-Men: The Last Stand, Smallville, Arrow, Deadpool, and The Professor.

== Arms ==
Coat of arms of Royal Roads University
Notes Granted 24 March 1998 Crest Rising out of a mural crown Azure masoned Argent three maple leaves conjoined on one stem Gules. Escutcheon Azure a demi sun in splendour Argent issuant from an embattled wall Azure masoned Argent thereon a book expanded also Argent edged Gules. Supporters Upon a grassy mound rising above barry wavy Argent and Azure dexter a cougar Argent armed and langued Gules holding in the interior paw a representation of the Royal Crown proper and sinister a Chinese dragon Argent armed and langued Gules holding in the interior talons an anchor Or. Motto HUĆIST TŦE S,HELI ŁTE (Living Our Learning)

== See also ==
- Canadian Centre for Environmental Education (CCEE)
- Education in Canada
- Higher education in British Columbia
- List of universities in British Columbia
- Royal Roads Military College

== Books ==
- Dunnett, Peter J S; Rempel, W Kim (1990). Royal Roads Military College 1940-1990, a Pictorial Retrospective. Victoria, BC: Royal Roads Military College. ISBN 978-0-660-13462-8. OCLC 22505897.
- Robinson, Maurice; Hall, Beverley; Price, Paul (1995). Royal Roads : a celebration. Victoria, BC: Natural Light Productions. ISBN 978-0-9699430-0-6. OCLC 32388152.
