= HMS Badger (1911) =

Destroyer of the Royal Navy

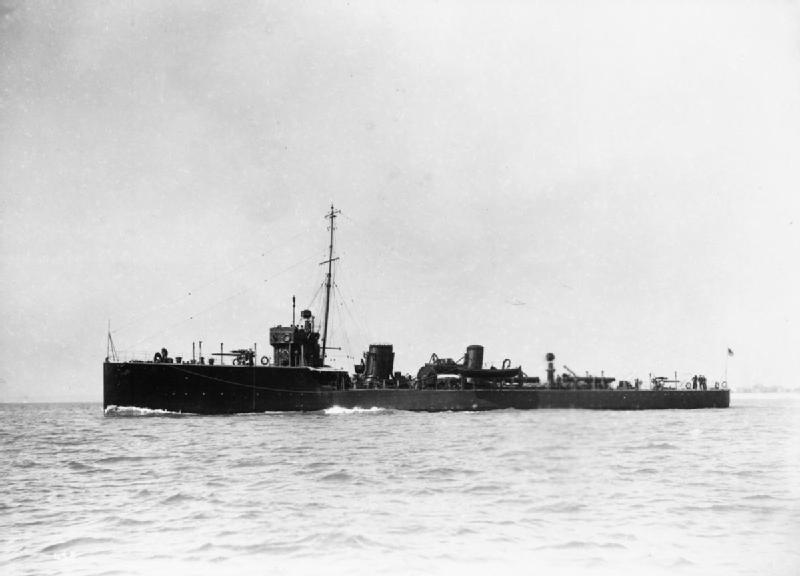
- HMS Badger during First World War

History

United Kingdom
- Name: HMS Badger
- Builder: William Denny & Brothers, Dumbarton
- Yard number: 933
- Launched: 11 July 1911
- Fate: Sold 9 May 1921

General characteristics
- Class & type: Acheron-class destroyer
- Displacement: 990 tons
- Length: 75 m (246 ft)
- Beam: 7.8 m (26 ft)
- Draught: 2.7 m (8.9 ft)
- Installed power: 13,500 shp (10,100 kW)
- Propulsion: 3 × Parsons turbines; 3 × Yarrow oil-fired boilers; 3 × shafts
- Speed: 27 kn (50 km/h)
- Complement: 70
- Armament: 2 × BL 4-inch (101.6 mm) L/40 Mark VIII guns, mounting P Mark V; 2 × QF 12-pounder 12 cwt naval gun, mounting P Mark I; 2 × single tubes for 21 inch (533 mm) torpedoes

HMS Badger was an Acheron-class destroyer of the Royal Navy that served during the First World War and was sold for breaking in 1921. She was the eighth Royal Navy ship to be named Badger, after the mammal of the same name.

== Construction ==
She was built under the 1910-11 shipbuilding programme by William Denny & Brothers of Dumbarton and was launched on 11 July 1911. She and her sister-ship Beaver were completed with geared steam turbines for evaluation purposes and were known as "Parsons Specials".

== Pennant numbers ==
Pennant number	From	To
H15	6 December 1914	1 September 1915
H52	1 September 1915	1 January 1918
H09	1 January 1918	Early 1919
H91	Early 1919	9 May 1921

== Career ==
=== Pre-war ===
Badger served with the First Destroyer Flotilla from 1911 and, with her flotilla, joined the British Grand Fleet in 1914 on the outbreak of the First World War.

=== First World War ===
She was present on 28 August 1914 at the Battle of Heligoland Bight, detached from the First Destroyer Flotilla along with Jackal, Beaver and Sandfly. She shared in the prize money for the engagement.

On 24 October 1914 she became the first Allied ship to successfully attack a German Navy U-boat when she rammed U-19 off the Dutch coast. U-19 was severely damaged but managed to return to port, was repaired and survived the war.

The 1st Destroyer Flotilla served at Jutland; it was Badger's distressing duty to rescue the crew of HMS Invincible, which had blown up after a German salvo penetrated the magazines. Of the crew of 1,021, only two officers and four crew were rescued. Badger's commanding officer at the time of the battle was Commander C A Fremantle.

On 17 April 1917 at 1930 hrs, SS Lanfranc was torpedoed four miles northeast of Le Havre by UB-40 while bound for Southampton. At the time she had 387 patients, of which 167 were German prisoners of war, and of these patients, 326 were cot-bound. Approximately 570 survivors were picked up by Badger and HMS Jackal, aided by HMS P47 and the French patrol boat Roitelet, and taken to Portsmouth.

Lieutenant Commander Geoffrey Corlett received the Italian Naval Decoration for service off Durazzo in Albania while serving as the captain of HMS Badger.

At 0700 hrs on 4 February 1918, Badger joined convoy HX-20 along with seven other Royal Navy destroyers from Lough Swilly, Northern Ireland. At 1845 the next day, while transiting the North Channel, SS Tuscania of 14,348 GRT was torpedoed by UB-77. The ship was packed with United States soldiers, and 210 people died in the sinking.

=== Post-war ===
In common with most of her class, she was laid up after the First World War and in May 1921 she was sold for breaking.

== Bibliography ==
=== References ===
- Preston, Antony (1977). Destroyers. Hamlyn. ISBN 9780600329558.
