= Colwood =

Colwood may refer to:

Canada

- Colwood, British Columbia

United Kingdom

- Colwood, Cornwall
- Colwood, West Sussex

United States

- Colwood, Michigan
