= Kraft Hockeyville =

Community competition in ice hockey

- Kraft Hockeyville logo
- Created by: Tony Chapman; Fred Nicolaidis; Pamela McNair; Harry Doupe; Jack Hewitt
- Countries of origin: Canada (2006–present); United States (2015–2020)
- Original language: English
- No. of seasons: 13

Production
- Running time: 44 minutes (2006); 5 minutes (2007–present)

Original release
- Network: CBC Television/Sportsnet (Canada, 2006–present); NBC/NBCSN (United States, 2015–2020)
- Release: 2006 – present

Kraft Hockeyville is an annual competition sponsored by Kraft Heinz, the National Hockey League and the NHL Players' Association in which communities compete to demonstrate their commitment to the sport of ice hockey. The winning community gets a cash prize dedicated to upgrading their local home arena, as well as the opportunity to host an NHL pre-season game. Runners-up also get smaller cash prizes to upgrade their ice rinks. The contest is normally held in the winter and spring during the latter half of the NHL regular season while the winner is announced in late March or April and before the Stanley Cup Playoffs, with the pre-season game usually held in September before the following regular season. If the winning arena is not adequately equipped to host the pre-season game, it is then played at an alternative site nearby.

The idea and theme was developed by Capital C, a Canadian Advertising Agency that was founded by Tony Chapman. The contest itself was developed by Fred Nicolaidis, Pamela McNair, Harry Doupe of the CBC and Jack Hewitt of Kraft Canada. The competition was first held across Canada in 2006 as a reality television series aired by CBC Television, but since 2007, it has been relegated to segments aired during CBC's Hockey Night in Canada. Kraft expanded the event in 2015 to the United States, with segments of the US contest airing on the NHL on NBC until 2020.

The Kraft Hockeyville games are televised regionally, in their respective countries on national basis. From 2006 to 2014, the Canadian game was broadcast across Canada on CBC, while Sportsnet took over airing it in 2015. The United States game was televised nationally in the U.S. on NBCSN from 2015 to 2020.

== Rules ==
Communities are invited to submit their nominations. The application form also requires a short essay, and photographs or a video, depicting the community's hometown pride and passion for the game of hockey. A judging panel then selects four finalists. The winner is then determined by a public vote.

== History ==
=== 2006 season ===
The inaugural 2006 season of Hockeyville featured finalists Smithers, British Columbia, Falher and Airdrie, Alberta, Barry's Bay, Ontario, and as its very first champion, the community of Salmon River, Nova Scotia. Salmon River's entry, the "Deuvilles Rink", beat 450 other entries from across Canada. The initial four episodes for the 2006 season were shot at the Memorial Centre in Kingston, Ontario, with the final three episodes shot in Dave Andreychuk Mountain Arena & Skating Centre in Hamilton, Ontario.

The NHL exhibition game was held September 25 at the Colchester Legion Stadium in the neighbouring town of Truro (the Deuville Rink being too small); the Montreal Canadiens beat the Ottawa Senators 7–3.

- The Deuville rink was awarded the C$50,000 Home Depot gift card prize and with the cards the roof was reshingled, new rink lights were installed, ceiling insulated and a heated section was installed at the end of the arena.

=== 2007 season ===
The 2007 season of Hockeyville began on March 4 and was changed significantly from the previous season's format. Organizers made the application process more accessible. Communities could now enter by logging on to the website, creating a team name, filling out an application form, submitting a short essay and including three photographs which depict hometown pride and passion for the game of hockey. A video, which was a requirement in previous contests, is no longer part of the process.

In 2007 the series was no longer given its own time slot, but rather shown during broadcasts of Hockey Night in Canada.

The Top 10 communities resulting from the first round were Cornwall, Ontario; Nanaimo, British Columbia; Noëlville, Ontario; North Bay, Ontario; Plaster Rock, New Brunswick; Rockyford, Alberta; Saint-Hubert, Quebec; Smithers, British Columbia; Vernon, British Columbia and Warner, Alberta.

The Top 5 communities resulting from the second round were Cornwall, Noëlville, North Bay, Smithers and Warner.

North Bay was the winner. The Atlanta Thrashers beat the New York Islanders 4–3 in overtime.

=== 2008 season ===
The 2008 season of Kraft Hockeyville began February 23.

The top 10 communities that were in the running for Kraft Hockeyville 2008 were:

- East: Port aux Basques, Newfoundland and Labrador vs. Rothesay, New Brunswick
- West: Wilcox, Saskatchewan vs. Redwater, Alberta
- Quebec: Rouyn-Noranda vs. Village sur Glace de Roberval
- Ontario: Huntsville vs. Kingsville
- Wildcard: Winnipegosis, Manitoba vs. Pilot Mound, Manitoba

The top five communities were:

- Week 1: Village sur Glace de Roberval (Quebec Region)
- Week 2: Port aux Basques, Newfoundland and Labrador (Atlantic Region)
- Week 3: Kingsville, Ontario (Ontario Region)
- Week 4: Wilcox, Saskatchewan (Western Region)
- Week 5: Pilot Mound, Manitoba (Wildcard)

On April 8, 2008, Roberval won the title of Kraft Hockeyville 2008. Roberval won:

- C$100,000 towards upgrades to the Roberval Arena
- An NHL pre-season game at the Roberval Arena on Tuesday, September 23, 2008, in which the Montreal Canadiens defeated the Buffalo Sabres 3–2.
- A Hockey Night in Canada broadcast from Roberval

The pre-season game has been taped and shown on a Hockeyville special Saturday, September 27.

The four remaining communities from the Top 5 won:

- C$20,000 to be used for upgrades to the Home Arena that the community endorses
- A Hockey Night in Canada broadcast from each of the remaining top five communities

=== 2009 season ===
The 2009 edition had these cities as the five regional finalists:

- Atlantic: Harbour Grace, Newfoundland and Labrador
- Quebec: Thetford Mines, Quebec
- Ontario: Woolwich Township, Ontario
- Western: Terrace, British Columbia
- Wildcard: Humboldt, Saskatchewan

The winner, announced on March 7 during the Hockey Night in Canada broadcast, was Terrace, British Columbia. Terrace played host to the Vancouver Canucks and the New York Islanders on Monday, September 14, in which the Canucks defeated the Islanders by a score of 2–1. The game was broadcast live on NHL Network in the US, and highlights were televised during a one-hour Kraft Hockeyville broadcast showcasing their community on CBC Television. Terrace also received C$100,000 towards arena upgrades from Kraft Canada.

=== 2010 season ===
The five finalists for the 2010 edition of Hockeyville were:

- Atlantic: Bishop's Falls, Newfoundland and Labrador
- Quebec: Stanstead, Quebec
- Ontario: Dundas, Ontario
- Western: Cranbrook, British Columbia
- Wildcard: Lawrencetown, Nova Scotia

Dundas, Ontario was announced as the winner by Gary Bettman on April 3, 2010, during the Hockey Night in Canada broadcast with 1,066,855 votes. The game featured division rivals Buffalo Sabres and Ottawa Senators playing in Dundas's J. L. Grightmire Arena on September 28, 2010, with Buffalo winning 2–1. (Incidentally, Dundas has been, since 2000, within the boundaries of the city of Hamilton, Ontario, a frequent target of efforts regarding potential National Hockey League expansion.)

=== 2011 season ===
In 2011, the wildcard was eliminated and the West and Pacific divisions were split from each other.

The top five communities were:

- Pacific: Mackenzie, British Columbia
- West: Bentley, Alberta
- Ontario: Wolfe Island
- Quebec: Saint-Raymond
- Atlantic: Conception Bay South, Newfoundland and Labrador

Conception Bay South, NL, was declared the winner of Kraft Hockeyville 2011 on April 2, 2011. The town's arena received C$100,000 worth of renovations, and also was to host a pre-season game between the Ottawa Senators and the Atlanta Thrashers on September 26, 2011. However, with the purchase of the Thrashers and their re-location to Winnipeg as a revival of the Winnipeg Jets, the game was instead played between the Senators and Jets. Additionally, the game was re-located to the Mile One Centre in St. John's, 30 km north of Conception Bay South, which was the home arena of their newly relocated American Hockey League affiliate, the St. John's IceCaps (formerly the Manitoba Moose). The Jets defeated the Senators, 3–1; the game would also technically serve as the first IceCaps-related game, as many of the Jets players in the game were assigned to the team shortly thereafter.

Each of the other four finalists received C$25,000 in arena upgrades from Kraft.

=== 2012 season (Game played in 2013 season) ===
Stirling-Rawdon, Ontario, was the winner of the 2012 Kraft Hockeyville contest. The planned game between the Columbus Blue Jackets and the Toronto Maple Leafs on October 3 was eventually cancelled due to the 2012–13 NHL lockout, but other festivities continued as scheduled. An NHL alumni charity game was held in the town instead, with one of the participants being Stirling native Rob Ray. No contest was held in 2013 due to the lockout. A makeup game for the market was held in Belleville, Ontario, on 2013 between the Washington Capitals and the Winnipeg Jets.

=== 2014 season ===
The Top 16 towns for the Kraft Hockeyville contest were announced on Saturday, March 8. This year's contest has a theme much like the NHL itself: East VS West. This means there are eight towns chosen from Eastern Canada and eight towns from Western Canada.

From Eastern Canada:

- Richmond, ON
- Prescott, ON
- Beeton, ON
- Exeter, ON
- Chicoutimi, QC
- Kingston, NS
- Amherst, NS
- Central Bedeque, PEI

From Western Canada:

- Salmon Arm, BC
- Kimberly, BC
- Osoyoos, BC
- Bruderheim, AB
- St. Albert, AB
- Sylvan Lake, AB
- Swift Current, SK
- Arborg, MB

This year, the top 16 towns are guaranteed C$25,000 in upgrades to their arenas instead of the top 5. Then the top 4 (two from the East and two from the West) received at least C$50,000. The winner receives the usual prize of C$100,000, an NHL pre-season game hosted in their community, and a visit from CBC's Hockey Night in Canada. Sylvan Lake won the competition on April 7, and hosted a pre-season game between the Arizona Coyotes and the Calgary Flames on September 24.

=== 2015 season ===
For the 2015 season, Kraft Hockeyville USA, for the first time, drew candidates from the United States. The US finalist in the east was the Cambria County War Memorial Arena in Johnstown, Pennsylvania, while the finalist in the west was the Decatur Civic Center in Decatur, Illinois. Johnstown was named the winner on May 2, received US$150,000 for arena upgrades, and hosted the Tampa Bay Lightning and the Pittsburgh Penguins. The game was televised in the United States on NBCSN.

The Canadian Kraft Hockeyville finalist in the east was the Chatham Memorial Arena in Chatham, Ontario, and the finalist in the west was the Panorama Recreation Center Hockey Arena in North Saanich, British Columbia. North Saanich was named the winner on April 5, and received C$100,000 in upgrades. Because the Panorama Recreation Center Hockey Arena had a limited capacity of only 500, the pre-season game featuring the San Jose Sharks and the Vancouver Canucks was instead played at The Q Centre in nearby Colwood. For the first time, the Hockeyville game was broadcast in Canada on Sportsnet instead of CBC.

=== 2016 season ===
The Canadian Kraft Hockeyville finalist in the east was the Aréna St-Isidore in Saint-Isidore, Chaudière-Appalaches, Quebec, and the finalist in the west was the Pat Duke Memorial Arena in Lumby, British Columbia. Lumby was named the winner on April 2, and received C$100,000 in upgrades. Because the Pat Duke Memorial Arena had a limited seating capacity, the pre-season game featuring the Los Angeles Kings and the Edmonton Oilers on October 2 was instead played at Kal Tire Place in nearby Vernon.

The Kraft Hockeyville USA finalist in the east was the Lakeview Arena in Marquette, Michigan, and the finalist in the west was the Rushmore Thunderdome in Rapid City, South Dakota. Marquette was named the winner on April 30, received US$150,000 in upgrades, and hosted the Carolina Hurricanes and the Buffalo Sabres on October 4.

=== 2017 season ===
The Canadian Kraft Hockeyville finalist in the east was the O'Leary Community Sports Centre in O'Leary, Prince Edward Island, and the finalist in the west was the Ituna Skating Rink in Ituna, Saskatchewan. O'Leary was named the winner on April 2, 2017, and received C$100,000 in arena upgrades. Citing transportation and other issues with the O'Leary Community Sports Centre, the pre-season game between the New Jersey Devils and the Ottawa Senators on September 25, 2017, was instead played at the Consolidated Credit Union Place in nearby Summerside.

The Kraft Hockeyville USA finalist in the east was the Rostraver Ice Garden in Belle Vernon, Pennsylvania, and the finalist in the west was the Bloomington Ice Garden in Bloomington, Minnesota. Belle Vernon was named the winner on April 29, 2017, and received US$150,000 in arena upgrades. Because the Rostraver Ice Garden (despite being large by community arena standards and having hosted professional sports in the preceding decade) was deemed not fit to host a pre-season game, the contest between the St. Louis Blues and the Pittsburgh Penguins on September 24, 2017, was instead played the UPMC Lemieux Sports Complex in Cranberry, Butler County.

=== 2018 season ===
For 2018, the East vs. West theme that began in 2014 was discontinued. Instead in each contest, four finalists were selected from the pool of nominations to compete in the final round of voting.

The four Canadian finalists were High River, Alberta, Huntingdon, Quebec, Lafleche, Saskatchewan, and Lucan, Ontario. Lucan was named the Canadian winner on March 31, 2018, and awarded a prize of C$250,000 to upgrade Lucan Community Memorial Centre. The pre-season game in Lucan was played between the Ottawa Senators and the Toronto Maple Leafs on September 18.

The four USA finalists were Brandon, South Dakota, Clinton, New York, Middlebury, Vermont, and Shreveport, Louisiana. Clinton was named the USA winner on April 14, 2018, and awarded a prize of US$150,000 to upgrade Clinton Arena. The pre-season game in Clinton was between the Columbus Blue Jackets and the Buffalo Sabres on September 25.

=== 2019 season ===
The four Canadian finalists were Renous, New Brunswick, Rich Valley, Alberta, Saint-Polycarpe, Quebec, and Wilkie, Saskatchewan. Renous was named the Canadian winner on March 30, and awarded a prize of C$250,000 to upgrade Tom Donovan Arena. As Tom Donovan Arena was judged too small to host an NHL game, K. C. Irving Regional Centre in Bathurst, New Brunswick, instead hosted the Florida Panthers and the Montreal Canadiens on September 18.

The four USA finalists were Cadillac, Michigan, Calumet, Michigan, Eagle River, Wisconsin, and Sartell, Minnesota. Calumet was named the USA winner on March 31, and awarded a prize of US$150,000 to upgrade the Calumet Colosseum. The Colosseum hosted the St. Louis Blues and the Detroit Red Wings on September 26.

=== 2020 season ===
Due to the COVID-19 pandemic, the announcements of the four finalists for each contest were delayed until August. The four Canadian finalists were announced on August 2: Pense, Saskatchewan; Saint-Félicien, Quebec; Tyne Valley, Prince Edward Island; and Twillingate, Newfoundland and Labrador. Online voting was from August 14 to August 15. Twillingate was announced as the winner on the Hockey Night in Canada broadcast on August 15, and was awarded a prize of C$250,000 to upgrade George Hawkins Memorial Arena.

The four USA finalists were announced on August 16: East Grand Forks, Minnesota; El Paso, Texas; Wichita, Kansas; and River Falls, Wisconsin. Online voting was from August 29 to August 30. El Paso was announced as the winner on the NHL on NBC broadcast on August 30, and was awarded a prize of US$150,000 to upgrade El Paso County Coliseum.

Games held at both El Paso and Twillingate were postponed, as the NHL canceled the entire 2020 pre-season due to the pandemic. The makeup game for El Paso was rescheduled for October 3, 2021, between the Arizona Coyotes and the Dallas Stars. It was not televised nationally in the U.S., as ESPN and TNT replaced NBC as the league's U.S. national broadcasters prior to the start of the 2021–22 season, and neither of the two committed to airing the game on a Sunday night. Instead, the contest was streamed on nhl.com.

The makeup game for Twillingate was played on October 6, 2022, at the Steele Community Centre in Gander, Newfoundland and Labrador between the Ottawa Senators and the Montreal Canadiens. The game was only televised on French-language broadcaster TVA Sports.

=== 2021 season ===
Only the Canadian contest ran in 2021; in the United States, the previous year's unplayed matchup was made up in lieu of a new contest. The four Canadian finalists were announced on March 20, 2021: Bobcaygeon, Ontario; Elsipogtog First Nation, New Brunswick; Lumsden, Saskatchewan; and St. Adolphe, Manitoba. Online voting was from April 9 to April 10, with Elsipogtog being announced as the winner on the April 10 Hockey Night in Canada broadcast. The prize of C$250,000 was used to help finance repairs to the Chief Young Eagle Arena, which was damaged by a fire in September 2020. Due to the COVID-19 pandemic in the area, the makeup game for Elsipogtog was played on October 8, 2022, at the J.K. Irving Centre in Bouctouche, New Brunswick, between the Montreal Canadiens and the Ottawa Senators. The game was only televised on French-language broadcaster TVA Sports.

=== 2022 season ===
The U.S. Hockeyville contest was discontinued after Kraft Heinz's USA division declined to renew its part of the sponsorship with the league. The four Canadian finalists were announced on April 23, 2022: Princeton, British Columbia, Douro-Dummer, Ontario, Saint-Jean-sur-Richelieu, Quebec, and Sydney, Nova Scotia. Online voting was from May 6 to May 7, with Sydney being announced as the winner. The prize of C$250,000 will help upgrade the Cape Breton University Canada Games Complex, which has not been used for hockey in at least over two years since the CBU Capers do not have a hockey team. Supporters used the contest to help raise funds for the arena so it would become a permanent home for local female hockey associations. Since the previous two Hockeyville games were postponed into 2022 due to the COVID-19 pandemic, the one for Sydney was also delayed. The makeup game was scheduled for October 1, 2023, at Centre 200 in Sydney, between the Florida Panthers and the Ottawa Senators. This game was not televised nationally in Canada.

=== 2023 season ===
The four finalists for 2023 were announced on March 11: Maple Ridge, British Columbia, Ste. Anne, Manitoba, West Lorne, Ontario, and Saint-Anselme, Quebec. Online voting was held from March 31 to April 1. West Lorne was the winner, and the C$250,000 prize will help upgrade West Lorne Arena. The pre-season game was scheduled for September 27, 2023, at Joe Thornton Community Centre in St. Thomas, Ontario, between the Buffalo Sabres and the Toronto Maple Leafs.

=== 2024 season ===
The four finalists for 2024 were announced on March 9: Elliot Lake, Ontario, Enderby, British Columbia, Cochrane, Alberta, and Wolseley, Saskatchewan. Online voting was held from March 29 to March 30. Elliot Lake was the winner, and the C$250,000 prize will help upgrade Centennial Arena. The pre-season game was scheduled for September 29, 2024, at Sudbury Community Arena in Sudbury, Ontario, between the Pittsburgh Penguins and Ottawa Senators.

=== 2025 season ===
The four finalists were Crossfield, Alberta, Honeywood, Ontario, Saint-Boniface, Quebec and Lower Sackville, Nova Scotia. Saint-Boniface was the winner. It received C$250,000 prize to upgrade Aréna de Saint-Boniface and C$10,000 of youth hockey equipment. The pre-season game is scheduled for September 21, 2026 at Colisée Vidéotron in Trois-Rivières, Quebec.

=== 2026 season ===
The finalists list was expanded to 13, one for each province and territory. The provincial finalists were: Tumbler Ridge, British Columbia, Taber, Alberta, Blaine Lake, Saskatchewan, Grandview, Manitoba, Blackstock, Ontario, Scott, Quebec, Sackville, New Brunswick, Thorburn, Nova Scotia, Cornwall, Prince Edward Island and Stephenville, Newfoundland and Labrador. The territorial finalists were: Haines Junction, Yukon, Fort Providence, Northwest Territories and Arviat, Nunavut. Taber, Alberta was announced as the winner on April 4, 2026 with the exact site of the game yet to be determined, and the game will take place in the 2027 preseason.

== List of winners/pre-season games ==
Bolded teams denote winners

Date	Winning site (if applicable, alternative pre-season game site in parentheses)	Away team	Home team	Score	Recap
September 25, 2006	Deuvilles Rink, Salmon River, Nova Scotia (Colchester Legion Stadium, Truro, Nova Scotia) (Note: Deuvilles Rink was too small to host an NHL game. The pre-season match was moved to Truro.)	**Montreal Canadiens**	Ottawa Senators	7–3	Recap
September 17, 2007	North Bay Memorial Gardens, North Bay, Ontario	**Atlanta Thrashers**	New York Islanders	4–3 (OT)	Recap
September 23, 2008	Benoit-Levesque Arena, Roberval, Quebec	Buffalo Sabres	**Montreal Canadiens**	2–3	Recap
September 14, 2009	Terrace Sportsplex, Terrace, British Columbia	New York Islanders	**Vancouver Canucks**	1–2	Recap
September 28, 2010	J. L. Grightmire Arena, Dundas, Ontario	**Buffalo Sabres**	Ottawa Senators	2–1	Recap
September 26, 2011	Robert French Memorial Stadium, Conception Bay South, Newfoundland and Labrador (Mile One Centre, St. John's, Newfoundland and Labrador) (Note: Robert French Memorial Stadium was initially slated to host the game. However, it was moved to St. John's in recognition of the Winnipeg Jets' then-new affiliated minor league team, the St. John's IceCaps.)	**Winnipeg Jets**	Ottawa Senators	3–1	Recap
September 14, 2013	Stirling Arena, Stirling-Rawdon, Ontario (Yardmen Arena, Belleville, Ontario) (Note: The game was originally scheduled October 3, 2012, between the Columbus Blue Jackets and Toronto Maple Leafs at Stirling Arena. Due to the 2012–13 NHL lockout, the entire preseason was cancelled, as well as the ensuing Kraft Hockeyville contest for the next season. The 2013-14 season Hockeyville game is a makeup game for the Stirling-Rawdon/Belleville area.)	**Washington Capitals**	Winnipeg Jets	4–3 (SO)	Recap
September 24, 2014	Sylvan Lake Arena, Sylvan Lake, Alberta	Arizona Coyotes	**Calgary Flames**	3–4 (OT)	Recap
September 21, 2015	Panorama Recreation Center Hockey Arena, North Saanich, British Columbia (The Q Centre, Colwood, British Columbia) (Note: Panorama Recreation Center was too small to host an NHL game. The pre-season match was moved to Colwood.)	San Jose Sharks	**Vancouver Canucks**	0–1 (OT)	Recap
September 29, 2015	Cambria County War Memorial Arena, Johnstown, Pennsylvania	Tampa Bay Lightning	**Pittsburgh Penguins**	2–4	Recap
October 2, 2016	Pat Duke Memorial Arena, Lumby, British Columbia (Kal Tire Place, Vernon, British Columbia) (Note: Pat Duke Memorial Arena was too small to host an NHL game. The pre-season match was moved to Vernon.)	Los Angeles Kings	**Edmonton Oilers**	2–3	Recap
October 4, 2016	Lakeview Arena, Marquette, Michigan	Carolina Hurricanes	**Buffalo Sabres**	0–2	Recap
September 24, 2017	Rostraver Ice Garden, Belle Vernon, Pennsylvania (UPMC Lemieux Sports Complex, Cranberry Township, Pennsylvania) (Note: Rostraver Ice Garden was not adequately equipped to host an NHL game. The pre-season match was moved to Cranberry Township.)	**St. Louis Blues**	Pittsburgh Penguins	4–1	Recap
September 25, 2017	O'Leary Community Sports Center, O'Leary, Prince Edward Island (Consolidated Credit Union Place, Summerside, Prince Edward Island) (Note: The pre-season match was moved to Summerside due to transportation issues.)	**New Jersey Devils**	Ottawa Senators	8–1	Recap
September 18, 2018	Lucan Community Memorial Centre, Lucan, Ontario	Ottawa Senators	**Toronto Maple Leafs**	1–4	Recap
September 25, 2018	Clinton Arena, Clinton, New York	**Columbus Blue Jackets**	Buffalo Sabres	4–2	Recap
September 18, 2019	Tom Donovan Arena, Renous, New Brunswick (K. C. Irving Regional Centre, Bathurst, New Brunswick) (Note: Tom Donovan Arena was too small to host an NHL game. The pre-season match was moved to Bathurst.)	Florida Panthers	**Montreal Canadiens**	3–4	Recap
September 26, 2019	Calumet Colosseum, Calumet, Michigan	St. Louis Blues	**Detroit Red Wings**	1–4	Recap
October 3, 2021 (Note: Games for the 2020 winners were postponed due to the COVID-19 pandemic.)	El Paso County Coliseum, El Paso, Texas	Arizona Coyotes	**Dallas Stars**	3–6	Recap
October 6, 2022	George Hawkins Memorial Arena, Twillingate, Newfoundland and Labrador (Steele Community Centre, Gander, Newfoundland and Labrador)	**Ottawa Senators**	Montreal Canadiens	4–3	Recap
October 8, 2022 (Note: Game for the 2021 winner was postponed due to the COVID-19 pandemic.)	Chief Young Eagle Arena, Elsipogtog First Nation, New Brunswick (J.K. Irving Centre, Bouctouche, New Brunswick)	Montreal Canadiens	**Ottawa Senators**	2–3 (OT)	Recap
September 27, 2023	West Lorne Arena, West Lorne, Ontario (Joe Thornton Community Centre, St. Thomas, Ontario)	Buffalo Sabres	**Toronto Maple Leafs**	2–5	Recap
October 1, 2023 (Note: The game for the 2022 winner was postponed, as the previous two Hockeyville games were rescheduled into 2022 due to the COVID-19 pandemic.)	Cape Breton University Canada Games Complex, Sydney, Nova Scotia (Centre 200, Sydney, Nova Scotia)	Florida Panthers	**Ottawa Senators**	2–4	Recap
September 29, 2024	Centennial Arena, Elliot Lake, Ontario (Sudbury Community Arena, Sudbury, Ontario)	**Pittsburgh Penguins**	Ottawa Senators	5–2	Recap
