= Belmont Park, Colwood =

Canadian Armed Forces military neighbourhood

Belmont Park
- PMQ Neighbourhood
- Location of Belmont Park within the Capital Regional District

- Location of Belmont Park within British Columbia Belmont Park (British Columbia)
- Country: Canada
- Province: British Columbia
- Metropolitan area: Greater Victoria

Government
  - Body: Canadian Forces Housing Agency

Area
  - Land: 44.943 ha (111.057 acres)
- Elevation: 20 m (66 ft)
- Time zone: UTC−07:00 (Pacific Time)
- Postal Code: V9C 1

Belmont Park is a Canadian Armed Forces PMQ neighbourhood in the City of Colwood, part of the Western Communities area of Greater Victoria, British Columbia, Canada.

It is located on property owned by the Department of National Defence and under the jurisdiction of the Canadian Forces Military Police.

The neighbourhood is home to École John Stubbs Memorial School, a French Immersion Elementary-Middle School, a part of School District 62 Sooke (SD62).
