= Jack Kane (disambiguation) =

Jack Kane (1908–1988) was an Australian politician.

Jack Kane may also refer to:

- Jack Kane (composer) (1924–1961), Canadian musician
- Jack Kane (ice hockey) (1936–2025), Canadian sportsman
- Jack Kane (Lord Provost) (1911–1999), Scottish politician and social campaigner
