= Fort Rodd Hill National Historic Site =

Fort near Victoria, British Columbia, Canada

Fort Rodd Hill
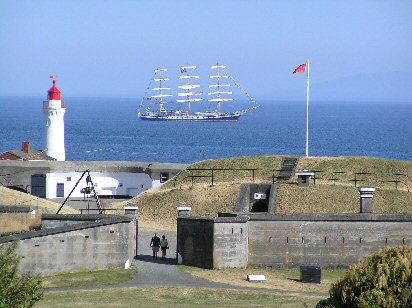
- View of the Strait of Juan de Fuca from the Lower Battery
- Interactive map of Fort Rodd Hill
- 48.4323°N 123.4504°W
- Location: Colwood, British Columbia, Canada

History
- Built: 1895–1897
- Original use: Military Fortification

Site notes
- Governing body: Parks Canada
- Website: Official website

National Historic Site of Canada
- Official name: Fort Rodd Hill National Historic Site
- Designated: 3 November 1958

Fort Rodd Hill National Historic Site is a 19th-century coastal artillery fort located on Esquimalt Harbour in Colwood, British Columbia, Canada. It was constructed in the 1890s by the Royal Marine Artillery to defend the Esquimalt Naval Base. It consists of three gun batteries, and was in continuous use by the Royal Canadian Artillery until 1956.

The site is adjacent to Fisgard Lighthouse National Historic Site, the first lighthouse on the west coast of Canada. Both the fort and lighthouse are managed and presented to the public by Parks Canada.

== History ==
=== Background ===
Rodd Hill was named after John Rashleigh Rodd, First Lieutenant on HMS Fisgard under Captain John A. Duntze. Rodd was later promoted to rear admiral in 1877; vice admiral in 1884, and admiral in 1888. He died in 1892. Guns were first installed here in 1864 to protect Esquimalt Harbour.

Britain's Royal Navy began using Esquimalt Harbour in the 1840s, at first merely for anchorage, watering and for lumber; but the establishment of three hospital huts during the Crimean War of 1854–1856 marked the start of what is still an active naval base of the Royal Canadian Navy.

In 1862, the Royal Navy's Pacific Squadron was relocated to Esquimalt Harbour from Valparaíso, Chile (where it had used floating storeships rather than built facilities ashore). This increased presence, eventually including storehouses and workshops ashore, required some form of coastal defence to deter naval attack by an enemy. This need was reinforced by the influx of American gold miners during the Fraser River Gold Rush of 1858, and by the armed standoff of U.S. and British forces during the San Juan Islands Pig War of 1859 and continuing tensions associated with that dispute until its resolution in 1871.

It was not until after the Colony of Vancouver Island had joined the mainland of British Columbia in 1866, and then Canada in 1870, that the first fixed coastal defences were emplaced to protect the naval base. During the Great Eastern Crisis in 1877–1878, increased tension between Britain and Russia over the latter's declaration of war on Turkey focused attention on the lack of defences for Britain's only naval station on the western seaboards of both North and South America. Volunteers for artillery training were mustered in Victoria on 18 May, while Lieutenant-Colonel De La Chevois Irwin, Inspector-General of Artillery at Kingston, Ontario, was sent (by train, across the United States) to organize the defences.

Five batteries of guns (mainly 64-pounder naval rifled muzzle loader) were constructed quickly, using earthen ramparts shored with timber. The largest guns of these defences were three 7-inch RML guns at Macaulay Point (covering the entrance of both Victoria and Esquimalt Harbours), and one 8-inch RML on Brothers Island (at the mouth of Esquimalt Harbour).

The Commander-in-Chief of the Pacific Squadron, Admiral de Horsey, inspected the new batteries and declared them inadequate; the local artillery militia could only muster enough gunners to serve half the guns, and as local citizens, it was felt that they might be inclined to give preference to guns defending Victoria rather than the naval base. De Horsey recommended that a permanent garrison of 100 Royal Marine Artillery, modern guns, and a submarine minefield be established as permanent defences.

=== Construction ===
The Canadian and British governments did not reach a defence agreement on the matter until 1893. During this time, the old guns and emplacements were still Victoria and Esquimalt's only fixed defences against attack. The 1893 agreement boiled down to this:

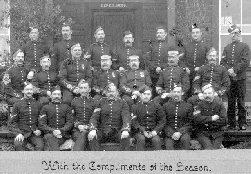
Group image of Royal Marine Artillerymen garrisoned at Fort Rodd Hill, 1897.

The British government would supply:

- guns, equipment, stores, and submarine mining buildings, to a total of £53,080;
- half the estimated cost of the defence works (£30,000);
- half the cost of annual maintenance (£500);
- and a garrison of 75 Royal Marine Artillerymen.

The Dominion of Canada would provide:

- all the land and buildings (save the submarine mining establishment);
- £10,000 towards the maintenance of the Royal Marine Artillery garrison; half the estimated cost of the defences (£30,000);
- half the cost of annual maintenance (£500);
- and maintain and expand the local militia.

The Royal Marine Artillery garrison, composed of specialists with two years' training, arrived in 1894. They were joined by officers and men of the Royal Engineers, to oversee construction of the permanent defences. The original plan called for Chinese labour to be used in construction, but local newspapers lobbied against this, and more expensive European (i.e., "white") day labourers were employed.

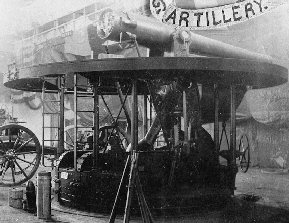
Fort Rodd Hill featured three 6-inch disappearing guns.

Between February 1894 and October 1897, two separate forts were constructed: one at Macaulay Point (site of earlier earthwork batteries), and an entirely new location at Rodd Hill, a bluff of rock overlooking the western side of the narrow entrance to Esquimalt harbour. Both forts would each mount three 6-inch disappearing guns (Mk VI barrels on a Mk IV mounting). Because of limitations of space in Rodd Hill, two of these guns were mounted with a common magazine in "Lower Battery", while the third required a separate battery (along with an underground magazine, loopholed wall, water supply, guardhouse, etc.) on another, higher hill some 200 metres away, named, logically, "Upper Battery."

These guns were sited in concrete emplacements 10 feet (3.0 m) thick, which were in turn protected by the rock massif of the hillside into which they were sunk. The barrels were normally kept down in the loading position, within the protection of the concrete emplacement (which also had an overhead metal shield). Using a central observation post and remote electric dial system to pass target information, the guns were loaded and aimed while in the "down" position. Only when actually about to fire, would the large hydro-pneumatic system raise the 5-tonne barrel up over the parapet.

The strength of the system was that the barrel was exposed to the enemy for a minimal amount of time, and with naval guns of the time firing on a flat trajectory, it was virtually impossible for an enemy ship to drop a shell on the emplacement, with its sloping rock glacis in front. Disadvantages of the system included a slow rate of fire (perhaps one shot every two minutes), and a propensity for the complicated hydro-pneumatic system to leak.

The 6-inch guns used "non-fixed ammunition", that is, the explosive cartridge that propelled the shell was stored and loaded separately from the shell or shot. Cartridges were made of raw silk, and stored in wooden crates in a special high-security section of the underground magazine. There were five types of shell on the Fort Rodd manifest in 1897: high explosive (Lyddite), armour-piercing, common pointed (for non-armoured maritime targets), and shrapnel. The other class of projectile (and the one most often fired) was a solid steel shot (without any cavity for explosives or fuses, it was cheapest to produce). The shells and shot all had the same service weight of 94 pounds (43 kg) (to simplify calculation of elevation and depression) and diameter of 6 inches (150 mm); therefore, lengths of the various types varied.

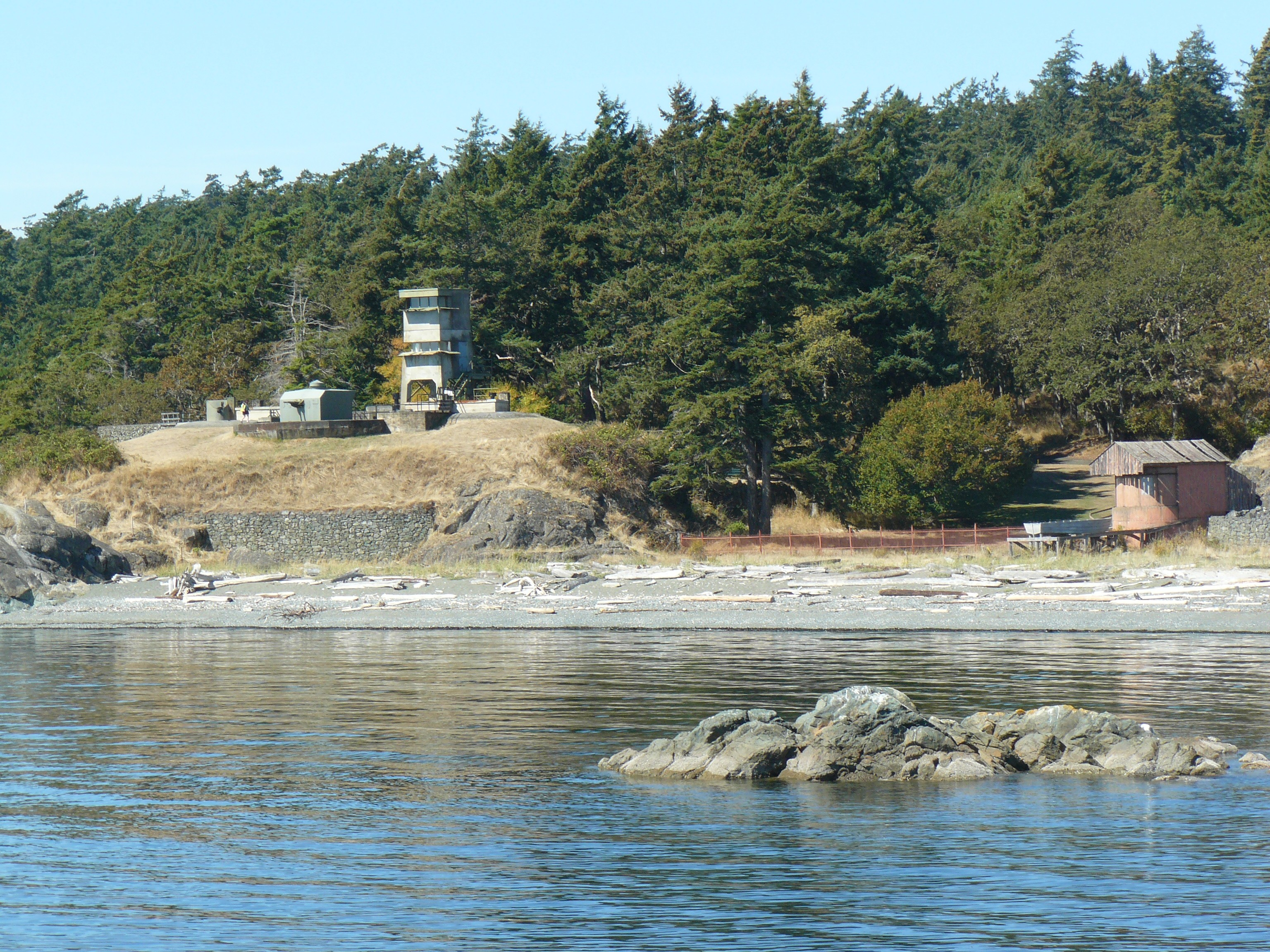
The Belmont Battery is one of several artillery encampments at Fort Rodd Hill. The encampment includes two quick-fire 12-pounder guns.

In addition to these medium guns (intended to fend off an attack by up to six enemy light cruisers), smaller quick-firing guns were sited, in order to deal with the potential threat of fast, unarmoured torpedo boats. At Fort Rodd, a separate emplacement, called Belmont Battery, was constructed to house two quick-firing 12-pounder guns, which were assisted by two sets of "defence electric lights" (searchlights), which were powered by diesel engines and generators concealed in an engine room built into the landward side of a hill.

For heavy, "counter-bombardment" defence, a battery of 9.2-inch guns was built at Signal Hill, on the east side of Esquimalt harbour; in the event, these guns did not become active until 1912, and even then were rarely fired, as the concussion caused significant damage to windows in Esquimalt village, directly below the battery.

The Royal Marine Artillery garrison was supplanted in 1899 by a larger garrison of Royal Garrison Artillery personnel, along with a detachments of Royal Engineers, including one specially trained in submarine mining. The local Canadian artillery militia continued to receive instruction and practice in gunnery, and became very proficient, winning several national competitions. Annual training schemes brought both Imperial and Colonial troops into sham battles and exercises, including a full-scale night assault on Fort Rodd Hill and Esquimalt Naval base in 1902.

=== 20th century ===
By the time of the Second World War, the original guns were considered obsolete. In 1944 a new QF 6 pounder 10 cwt gun in twin mounts was installed.

The fort was designated a National historic site of Canada in 1958. On 28 June 1985 Canada Post issued 'Fort Rodd Hill, B.C.' one of the 20 stamps in the "Forts Across Canada Series" (1983 & 1985). The stamps are perforated 12 1/2 × 13 and were printed by Ashton-Potter Limited based on the designs by Rolf P. Harder.

== See also ==
- List of World War II-era fortifications on the British Columbia Coast
- Fisgard Lighthouse
