= Belmont Secondary School =

Secondary school in Victoria, British Columbia

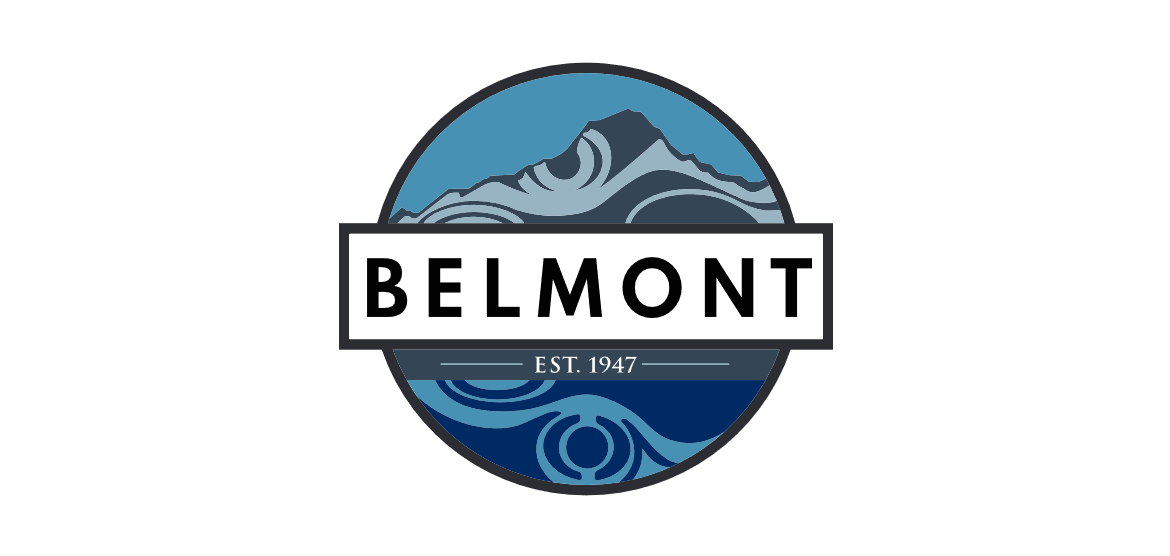

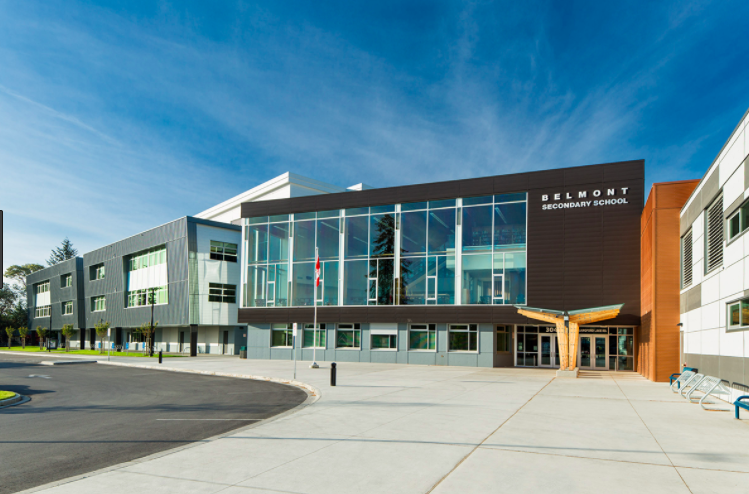

Location
- 3041 Langford Lake Road; Langford, British Columbia, V9B 0L9; Canada

Information
- School type: Public Secondary
- Founded: 1947
- School board: Sooke School District 62
- Principal: Laura Fulton
- Vice Principal(s): Kimberly Scott; Cameron Smith; Stephen McHugh
- Grades: 9–12
- Enrollment: 1,628 (2024–25)
- Capacity: 1,200 (1,320 including Portable Classrooms)
- Language: English
- Schedule: M-Th: 9 am-3:20 pm F: 9 am-2:23 pm
Colour
- Mascot: Bulldog
- Team name: Bulldogs
- Feeder schools: Spencer Middle School Centre Mountain Lellum Middle School
- Portable Classrooms on-site: 5
- Website: belmont.sd62.bc.ca

Belmont Secondary School is a secondary school located in Langford, a western suburb of Victoria, British Columbia, Canada. It is one of three secondary schools in School District 62 Sooke. It serves the suburban West Shore area of Colwood, Highlands, Langford, and Metchosin. The school ranks as the largest Secondary School by student population on Vancouver Island.

== History ==
The first secondary school in the area was established on the school's former Jacklin Road site soon after the Second World War in re-located Army buildings. Several years later, two schools were constructed in permanent buildings: Elizabeth Fisher Junior High School and Belmont High School. These were merged in 1973 into Belmont-Fisher Secondary School, and a new library was constructed to connect the adjacent buildings. After two years under this name, it was shortened to the current Belmont Secondary School.

In 2021, in response to increasing enrollment and limited capacity, the school board approved the transfer of the French Immersion program to Royal Bay Secondary School over a three-year period. An expansion at Royal Bay Secondary, completed prior to the transition, increased the school’s capacity by 600 students. The transfer was finalized at the end of the 2023–24 school year, with 2024 marking the final graduating class from the French Immersion program at Belmont, concluding a 30-year run that began in the 1993–94 school year.

== New facilities ==
In December 2012, it was announced that Belmont was to be replaced with two new grade 9–12 schools: a 1,200-student replacement Belmont Secondary in the Glen Lake area of Langford, and a new 800-student Royal Bay Secondary School to be built in Colwood. The new facilities were intended to support a wide range of programs, including expanded students' skills and trades training. Additional programs such as culinary arts and automotive technician are being considered and links to the shipbuilding industry with possible metal fabrication and marine trades training programs are being explored. Both new schools will have Neighbourhood Learning Centres to provide community services.

In June 2013, construction commenced on the $53.9-million Belmont replacement school on the site of the former Glen Lake Elementary School. Even before its replacement had been completed, the sale of the former site to food retailer Sobeys was announced on April 3, 2014. The new Belmont Secondary School opened to students for the first time on September 8, 2015.

== Academies ==
In addition to a challenging academic program ( including Dual Credit & AP classes), Belmont Secondary offers students the opportunity to participate Academy programs.

- Baseball Academy
- Softball Academy
- Hockey Academy

== Career programs ==
- Secondary School Apprenticeship
- Camosun College Partnership Programs
- Accelerated Credit Enrollment in Industry Training (ACE IT):
- ACE IT/Dual Credit Carpentry Program
- ACE IT Cosmetology Program
- ACE IT/Dual Credit Automotive Service Technician
- ACE IT/Dual Credit Joinery/Cabinetmaking Program

== Music ==
Belmont Secondary offers the following music programs and courses:
Concert Band, Concert Choir, Vocal Jazz, Jazz Band, R & B Band, Drumline, Introduction to Guitar, Music Composition and Production/Electronic Music, Introduction to Piano, Marching band, and Senior Band.

== Athletics ==
The school offers the following athletic and sports programs:

- Badminton
- Football
- Softball
- Basketball
- Golf
- Cross Country
- Hockey
- Volleyball
- Rugby
- Weight Room
- Soccer
- Dance
- Track and Field
- Mountain Biking
- Indoor rock climbing

== Notable alumni ==
- Tyson Barrie — former NHL player
- Adam Cracknell — former NHL player
- Ryder Hesjedal – UCI World Tour professional cyclist for Trek-Segafredo
- Paul Hyde — musician and record producer, a founding member of the bands Payola$, and Rock and Hyde
- Cory Monteith — actor, Glee
- Alex Newhook — NHL player, Montreal Canadiens
- Larry Pollard — former Canadian NASCAR Busch Grand National Series driver
- Jonathan Reaume - ARCA Menards Series West driver and team owner
- Josiah Reaume — ARCA Menards Series West driver
- Bob Rock — musician, sound engineer, and record producer, a founding member of the bands Payola$, and Rock and Hyde
- Mike Rowe — noted for establishing www.MikeRoweSoft.com and the ensuing lawsuit with software giant Microsoft
- David Smith — ARCA Menards Series West driver
- Jennifer Tilly — actress
