= EMCS =

EMCS may refer to:

- IEEE Electromagnetic Compatibility Society
- Edward Milne Community School, a secondary school in Sooke, British Columbia
