= Len Speck =

Canadian ice hockey player

- Born: August 23, 1929 (age 96) Kirkland Lake, Ontario, Canada
- Height: 5 ft 9 in (175 cm)
- Weight: 195 lb (88 kg; 13 st 13 lb)
- Position: Defense
- Shot: Left
- Played for: Clinton Comets
- Playing career: 1946–1971

Lennis Murray Speck (born August 23, 1929) is a Canadian former ice hockey player who played 10 seasons for the Clinton Comets in the Eastern Hockey League (EHL). He was an EHL first team all star in 1962, 1964, 1965, 1966, 1968 and 1969.
