= École John Stubbs Memorial School =

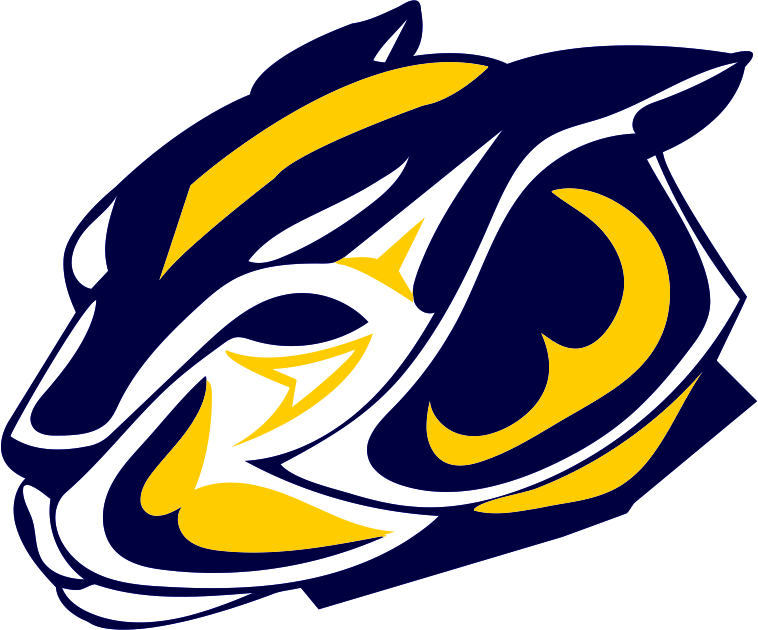

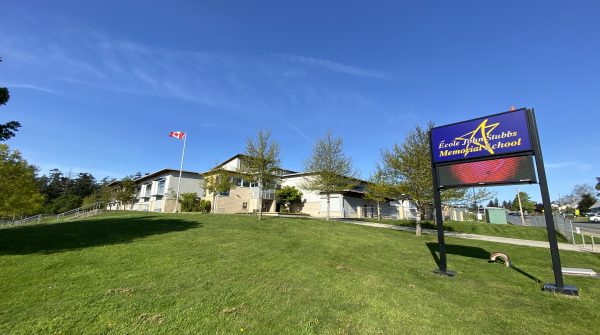

Location
- 301 Zealous Crescent; Colwood, British Columbia, V9C 1H6; Canada; 48.4366°N 123.4649°W

Information
- School type: Public, Elementary School, Middle School, French Immersion
- Motto: Ensemble on peut tout faire (Together, we can achieve anything)
- School board: School District 62 Sooke
- Educational authority: British Columbia Ministry of Education and Child Care
- Principal: Mellissa Ryan
- Vice Principals: Elementary: Jenn Dailey; Middle: Jennifer Gibson
- Grades: K-8
- Enrollment: Elementary: 473; Middle: 349 (2023-24)
- Capacity: Elementary: 518; Middle: 300
- Language: French, English
- Schedule: 8:45am-2:50pm
- Campus size: 5.26 ha
Color
Old:
New:
- Mascot: Jaguar
- Team name: Jaguars
- Communities served: Belmont Park; Colwood; Langford; Metchosin
- Feeder schools: Millstream Elementary School
- Feeder to: École Secondaire Royal Bay Secondary School
- Website: johnstubbs.sd62.bc.ca

École John Stubbs Memorial School is a K-8 French Immersion school located in the Belmont Park neighbourhood of Colwood, British Columbia, Canada, part of the Western Communities suburbs of Victoria. The school is part of School District 62 Sooke.

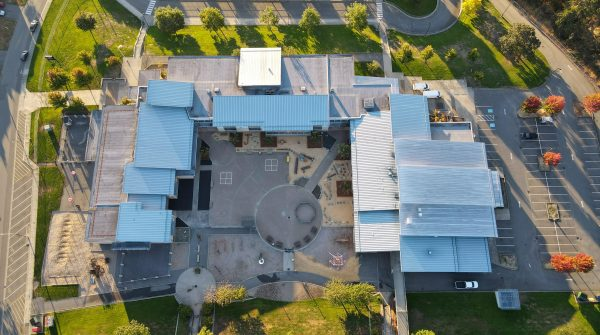
Overhead of school

École John Stubbs Memorial School features an Elementary School wing with early French Immersion ; and a Middle School wing with both Early and Late French Immersion. The school is found within the Canadian Armed Forces PMQ neighbourhood of Belmont Park, bordering Royal Roads University in Colwood, British Columbia. Due to the neighbouring property being owned by the Department of National Defence, the school is under the jurisdiction of the local Military Police unit. The school's population currently stands at approximately 800 students, but is currently experiencing growth year-to-year.

== History of the school's name ==
John Hamilton Stubbs a naval officer who was captain of the Second World War navy destroyer HMCS Athabaskan. (This is not the Canadian academic of the same name.) Ever since he was a boy, he wanted to join the navy. When he was 10 years old, he joined the sea cadets, not knowing that in a few years he would be a Second World War hero.

On April 28, 1944, two enemy German boats attacked Athabaskan and her sister ship HMCS Haida. Approximately 10 minutes after the first hit, Athabaskan was ripped under the water by another torpedo.

The weight of the water pouring into Athabaskan's compartments had now dragged her down to the point where she was almost perpendicular. The last men to leave were sliding down her bow into the chilling water.

When the sailors were in the water, John Stubbs moved about from float to float offering words of encouragement and telling them to move their arms and legs.

Lieutenant-commander Stubbs also told them to sing this navy song: "Roll along, Wavy Navy, roll along Roll along, Wavy Navy, roll along If you must know who we are We're the RCNVR Roll along, Wavy Navy, roll along. Oh we joined for the money and the fun Yes, we joined for the money and the fun But of money there is none And the fun has just begun Roll along, Wavy Navy, roll along."

At one point, John Stubbs drifted to within several feet of the Haida's side and shouted his final command, "Get out of here, Haida! E-boats!" At that point, he might have been rescued quite handily, but he elected to stay with the remainder of his company. Ordering the Haida to safety, Lieutenant-commander John Hamilton Stubbs never thought that they would be defeated so he and his men never gave up.
