= Joe Robertson (ice hockey) =

Canadian ice hockey player

- Born: March 10, 1948 (age 78) Windsor, Nova Scotia, Canada
- Height: 5 ft 11 in (180 cm)
- Weight: 180 lb (82 kg; 12 st 12 lb)
- Position: Centre
- Shot: Left
- Played for: WHA; Minnesota Fighting Saints; Indianapolis Racers; AHL; Cincinnati Swords; Syracuse Eagles; WHL; Salt Lake Golden Eagles; Seattle Totems; CHL; Omaha Knights; EHL; Clinton Comets
- NHL draft: Undrafted
- Playing career: 1968–1975

Joseph Dunbar Robertson (born March 10, 1948) is a Canadian former professional ice hockey player.

== Early life ==
Robertson was born in Windsor, Nova Scotia, and attended King's-Edgehill School. He played junior hockey with the Oshawa Generals.

== Career ==
Robertson began his minor league career with the Clinton Comets of the Eastern Hockey League. He was later a member of the Omaha Knights, Salt Lake Golden Eagles, Seattle Totems, and Cincinnati Swords. During the 1974–75 season, Robertson played 29 games in the World Hockey Association with the Minnesota Fighting Saints and Indianapolis Racers.

== Career statistics ==
=== Regular season and playoffs ===
			Regular season					Playoffs
Season	Team	League	GP	G	A	Pts	PIM	GP	G	A	Pts	PIM
1966–67	Oshawa Generals	OHA	47	3	8	11	117	––	––	––	––	––
1967–68	Oshawa Generals	OHA	39	10	17	27	72	––	––	––	––	––
1968–69	Clinton Comets	EHL	72	29	43	72	213	17	8	8	16	29
1969–70	Clinton Comets	EHL	69	45	63	108	212	17	11	12	23	70
1969–70	Omaha Knights	CHL	––	––	––	––	––	3	0	0	0	4
1970–71	Salt Lake Golden Eagles	WHL	71	12	28	40	71	––	––	––	––	––
1971–72	Salt Lake Golden Eagles	WHL	7	0	0	0	9	––	––	––	––	––
1971–72	Seattle Totems	WHL	3	0	0	0	10	––	––	––	––	––
1971–72	Cincinnati Swords	AHL	43	3	4	7	129	9	2	1	3	17
1972–73	Cincinnati Swords	AHL	76	30	50	80	125	15	8	9	17	33
1973–74	Cincinnati Swords	AHL	55	21	30	51	101	3	0	0	0	2
1974–75	Indianapolis Racers	WHA	18	4	4	8	23	––	––	––	––	––
1974–75	Johnstown Jets	NAHL	5	4	2	6	7	––	––	––	––	––
1974–75	Minnesota Fighting Saints	WHA	11	1	4	5	4	––	––	––	––	––
1974–75	Syracuse Eagles	AHL	23	4	17	21	49	1	0	0	0	0
WHA totals			29	5	8	13	27	—	—	—	—	—
