= Clinton Comets =

Ice hockey team in New York, US

- City: Clinton, New York (1927–1973), Utica, New York (1973–1977)
- League: NYSAHL (1949–1949/50), NYOHL (1950/51 – 1953/54), EHL (1954/55 – 1972/73), NAHL (1973/74 – 1976/77), ACHL
- Founded: 1927
- Home arena: Russell Sage Rink (?? – 1949), Clinton Arena (1949–1973), Utica Memorial Auditorium (1973–1977)
- Colors: Red, White, and Blue

Franchise history
- 1927–1948: Clinton Hockey Club
- 1949–1973: Clinton Comets
- 1973–1977: Mohawk Valley Comets

Championships
- Playoff championships: Five (1959, 1964, 1968, 1969, 1970)

The Clinton Comets were an American ice hockey team in Clinton, New York.

== History ==
Founded in 1927–28 as the Clinton Hockey Club and nicknamed the Comets in 1949, the team played primarily at the Clinton Arena from 1949 until 1973. The team was founded by Ed Stanley, who acted as manager, recruited local high school students as players, and provided financing for the team to buy equipment and take road trips. In the 1933–1934 season, the Comets played in the National Amateur Championship at Madison Square Garden against the Hershey Bears. The team also received support from Albert I. Prettyman, an athletic administrator known for bringing college hockey to nearby Hamilton College. The 1940 Winter Olympics were scheduled for Sapporo, Japan, but were canceled because of the start of World War II, as well as the hopes of Comets players Wilfred Goering and Art Scoones who were trying out for the Olympic team.

From 1954 until 1973, the Comets participated in the Eastern Hockey League, dominating for ten of their nineteen seasons. Most notably, under head coach Pat Kelly, the Comets posted a 315–208–64 (wins-losses-ties) record of eight seasons. During that period, in the 1967–68 season, the Comets produced an awe-inspiring 57–5–10 record. The Comets won the EHL playoffs in 1958–59, 1963–64, 1967–68, 1968–69 and 1969–70.

Later, when the team began playing games in the Utica Memorial Auditorium, it changed its name to the Mohawk Valley Comets and played in the North American Hockey League.

== Notable alumni ==
Notable alumni of the Clinton Comets include:

- Eddie Giacomin, Hockey Hall of Fame goaltender with the New York Rangers
- Benny Woit, former player for the Detroit Red Wings
- Pete Babando, former player for the Detroit Red Wings, Boston Bruins and Chicago Black Hawks
- Patrick J. Kelly, head coach of the Colorado Rockies, founder and first league commissioner of the East Coast Hockey League, and namesake of Kelly Cup.
- Len Speck, who played on the team from 1961–1971
- Jack Timmins, player-coach from 1954 to 1958; went on to become general manager of the Tidewater Red Wings and commissioner of the North American Hockey League
- Jack Kane, 1997 Greater Utica Sports Hall of Fame inductee
- Joe Robertson, minor league centre

== Other hockey teams in the Mohawk Valley ==
- Utica Mohawks of the Eastern Hockey League (1978–80)
- Mohawk Valley Stars of the Atlantic Coast Hockey League (1981–84)
- Mohawk Valley Comets of the Atlantic Coast Hockey League (1985–87)
- Utica Devils of the American Hockey League (1987–93)
- Utica Bulldogs of the Colonial Hockey League (1993–94)
- Utica Blizzard of the Colonial Hockey League (1994–97)
- Mohawk Valley Prowlers of the United Hockey League (1998–2001)
- Mohawk Valley IceCats of the North Eastern Hockey League (2006–07)
- Utica Comets of the American Hockey League (2013–present)
