= Royal Bay Secondary School =

École Secondaire Royal Bay Secondary School
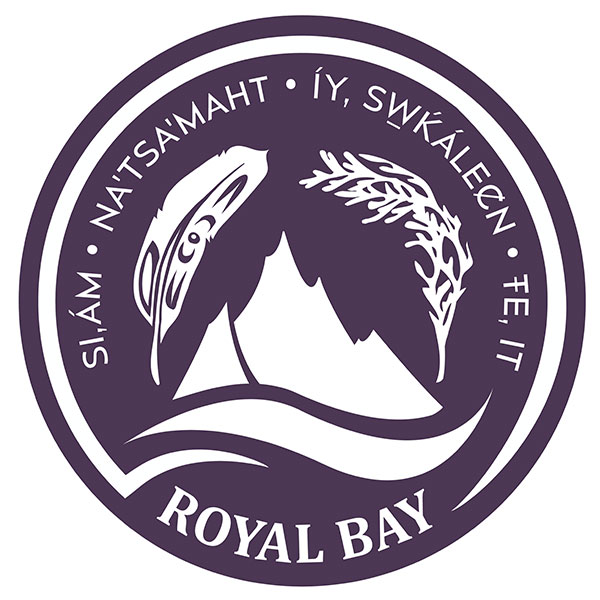

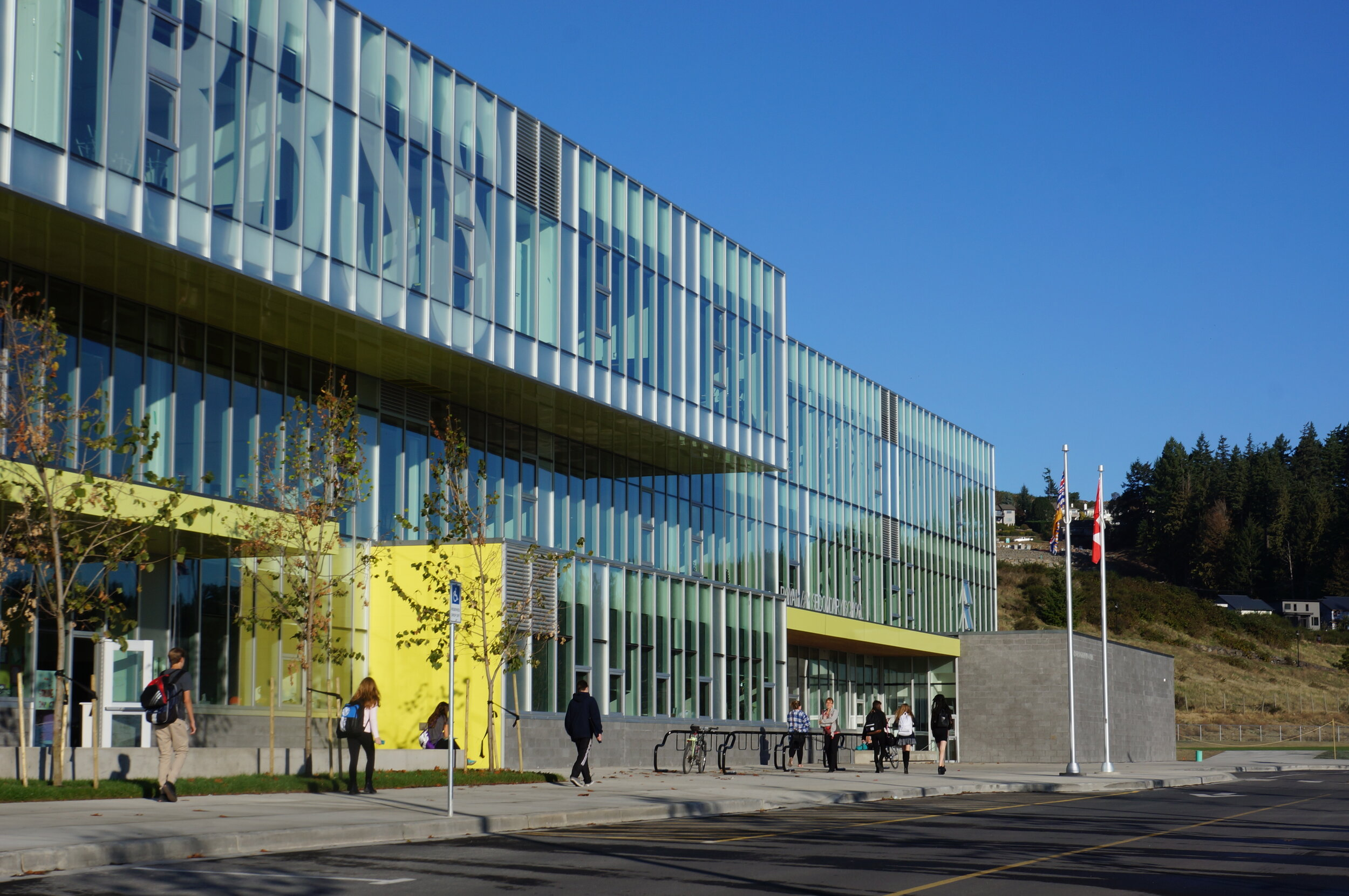

Location
- 3500 Ryder Hesjedal Way; Colwood, British Columbia, V9C 0J6; Canada; 48.4091°N 123.4941°W

Information
- School type: Public Secondary
- Motto: Together We Are More
- Founded: 2015
- School board: Sooke School District 62
- Educational authority: British Columbia Ministry of Education and Child Care
- Principal: Melissa Horner
- Vice Principal(s): Stephanie Davies; Martin Lait; Michelle Bond
- Grades: 9-12
- Enrollment: 1,574 (2024-25)
- Capacity: 1,400 (1,520 including Portable Classrooms)
- Language: English, French
- Schedule: M-Th: 9am-3:20pm F: 9am-2:23pm
- Campus size: 6.30 ha
Colour
- Mascot: Raven
- Team name: Ravens
- National ranking: 230/252
- Communities served: Colwood; Langford; Metchosin
- Feeder schools: École John Stubbs Memorial School Dunsmuir Middle School
- Portable Classrooms on-site: 4
- Website: royalbay.sd62.bc.ca

École Secondaire Royal Bay Secondary School (RBSS) is a secondary school located in Colwood, a western suburb of Victoria, British Columbia, Canada. It is one of three secondary schools in School District 62 Sooke and serves the suburban Westshore area of Colwood, Langford and Metchosin. The school ranks as the second largest Secondary School by student population on Vancouver Island, behind Belmont Secondary School.

== History and facilities ==
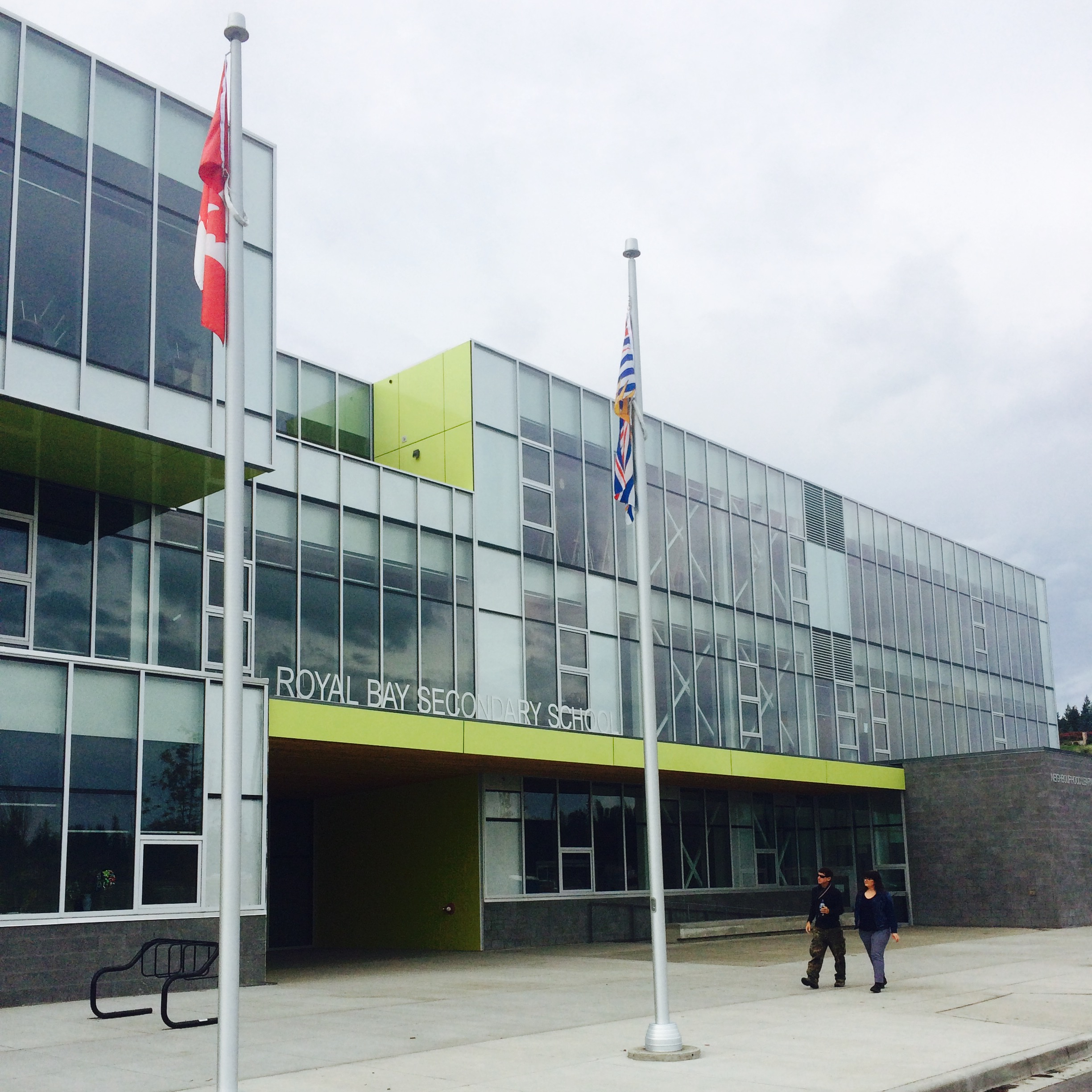
Royal Bay Secondary School, main entry, 2015

RBSS was established in 2015 as one of two new facilities to replace the former Belmont Secondary School on Jacklin Road in Langford.

In September 2013 construction commenced on the new $40.8-million RBSS. Shortly after construction started for the new RBSS building, local media noted that the school is located in the former gravel pit where the remains of a wooly mammoth were discovered in the 1960s. Part of the remains are now in the collection of the Royal British Columbia Museum.

In March 2018, a major building expansion was announced. Construction commenced January 2019 on the new $34-million 600 seat addition made up of 19 additional class rooms including 4 science labs and 2 state-of-the-art computer animation rooms, a third gymnasia featuring indoor artificial-turf, 2 additional athletic change rooms and office, two new parking lots, and a bus lane out front of the School property. Construction was completed October 2020 making RBSS the largest Secondary School on Vancouver Island.

Following the completion of the expansion, the school board approved the transfer of the French Immersion program from Belmont Secondary School to Royal Bay over a three-year period to address rising enrollment and capacity constraints. The transition was completed at the end of the 2023–24 school year, making Royal Bay the primary site for secondary French Immersion in the district.

The facilities are intended to support a wide range of programs, including expanded students' skills and trades training. The athletic facilities include three gymnasia, an Olympic size rubberized track, one artificial-turf play field, one grass play field, as well as a rooftop basketball court. The school incorporates the Teechamitsa Theatre, a 350-seat performing arts theatre which supports the drama and orchestra program. Career and Technical Education spaces included shop work areas for construction, auto/marine, and mechanical/marine courses. The school incorporates a Neighbourhood Learning Centre (NLC) to support both the school and community needs.

== Academies and special programs ==
RBSS offers academies and special programs in several areas:

- Soccer Academy
- Dance Academy
- Lacrosse Academy
- Girls' Lacrosse Academy
- French Immersion
- Culinary Arts
- Equine Studies
- Mountain Biking
- Dual Credit – in partnership with Camosun College, it is a dedicated trades program focusing on construction, plumbing, electrical, sheet metal, and pipe fitting where students can earn both high school and college credits.

== Black Wing Theatre Company ==
Every year, Royal Bay Secondary School's "Black Wing Theatre Company" presents a new performance at the Teechamitsa Theatre:

- Hadestown (2026)
- Chicago (2025)
- The Magician’s Nephew (2024)
- The Pajama Game (2023)
- Pippin (2022)
- Cabaret (2020)
- Peter and the Starcatcher (2019)
- Catch Me If You Can (2018)
- The Lion, the Witch, and the Wardrobe (2018)
- Urinetown (2017)
- The Ash Girl (2017)
- Jake's Gift (2016)
- Nice Work If You Can Get It (2016)
- Our Town (2015)
