= Calumet Colosseum =

Ice arena in Calumet, Michigan

Coordinates: 47.2438°N 88.4506°W

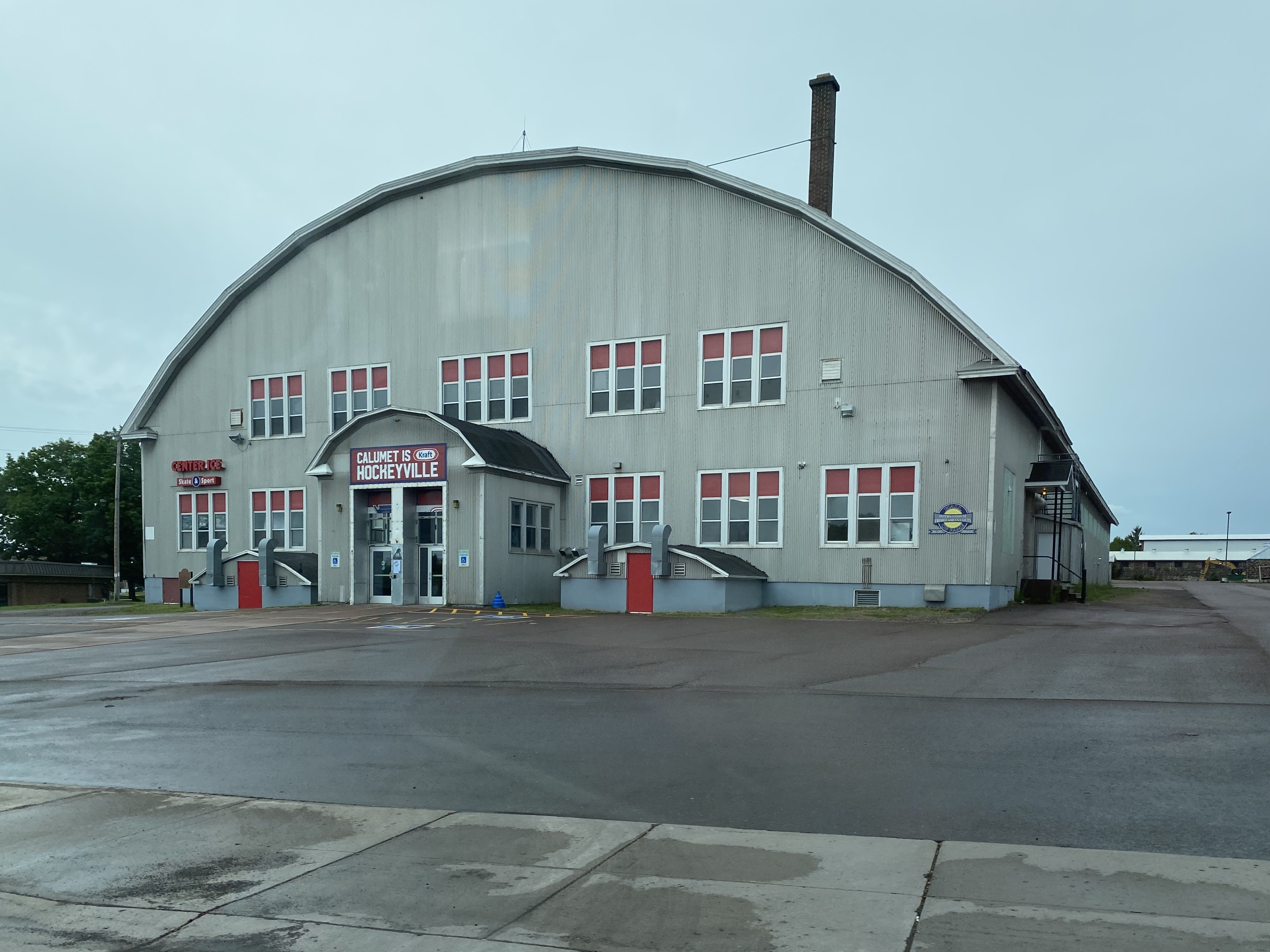
Calumet Colosseum in 2020

The Calumet Colosseum is an ice hockey arena in Calumet, Michigan, built in 1913. It was only a few years younger than the Matthews Arena, which opened in 1910 and then burned down in 1918. The building is a three-story, barrel roof structure. It has a seating capacity of 700.

== History ==
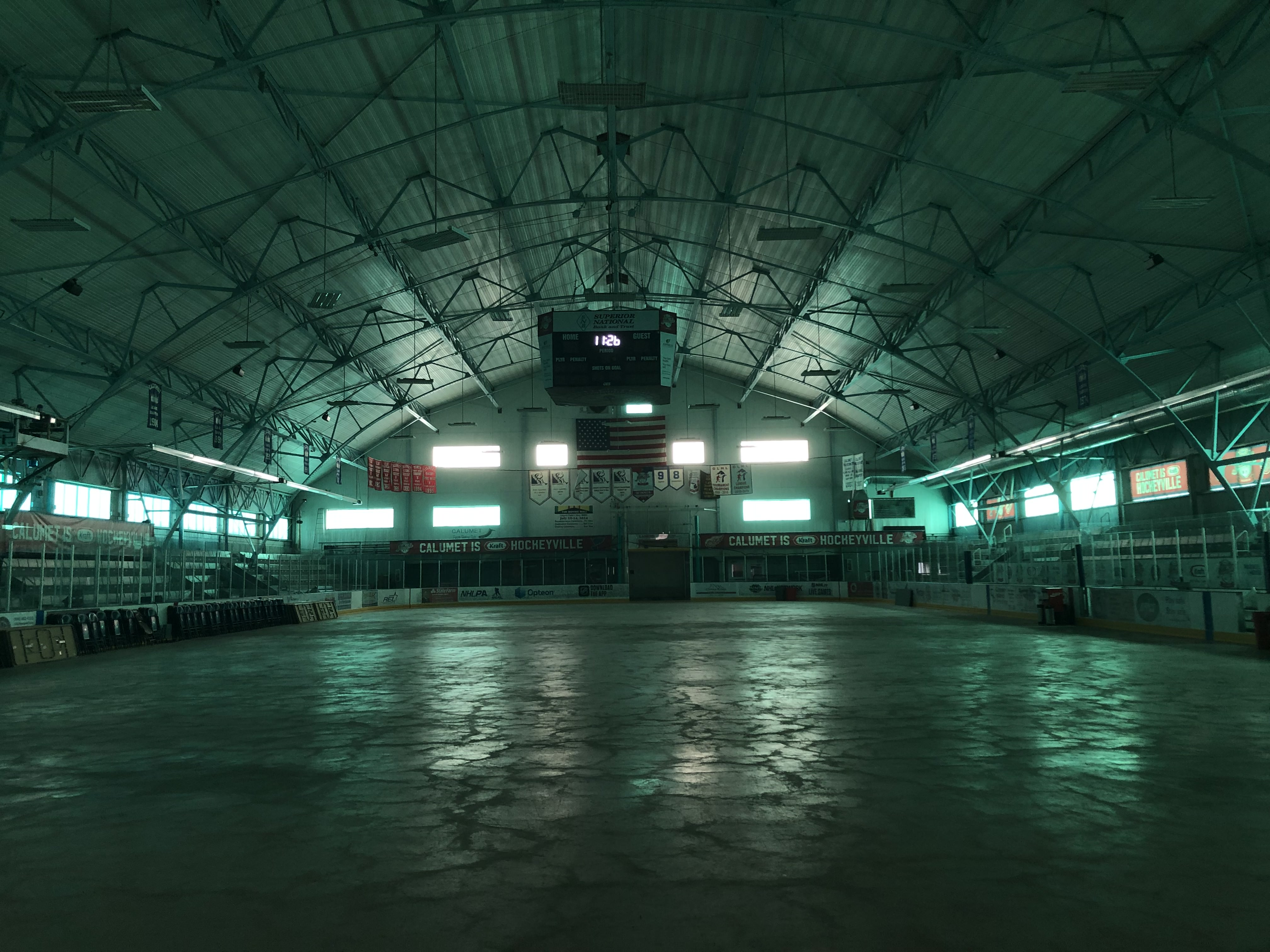
Interior

Construction of the Colosseum began in 1913 with the formal opening on January 1, 1914. The first game was played on January 6, between the Calumet Wolverines and the Portage Lake Pioneers.

Since 2011, the Colosseum has been home to the International Frisbee / USA Guts Hall of Fame, located in the second floor ballroom. It celebrates frisbee achievements along with another Copper Country original; Guts Frisbee and the International Frisbee Tournament, the oldest organization in frisbee.

In 1942, the National Guard armory in Calumet burned down and the Colosseum was sold to the State of Michigan. The name was changed to the Calumet Armory and it was used by the Calumet Detachment of the Michigan National Guard. Artificial ice was installed in 1968. In 2005, Calumet Township traded 12 acres of land for a new armory in exchange for the arena, and reverted the name to Calumet Colosseum.

In 2019, Calumet was the winner of Kraft Hockeyville USA, winning $150,000 for upgrades to the Colosseum. The arena received a new ice plant, a new heating system, sound system, and refurbished locker rooms. As part of winning the contest, the arena held an NHL pre-season game between the Detroit Red Wings and the St. Louis Blues on September 26, 2019. The Red Wings won the game, 4–1.
