= Fisgard Lighthouse National Historic Site =

Fisgard Lighthouse
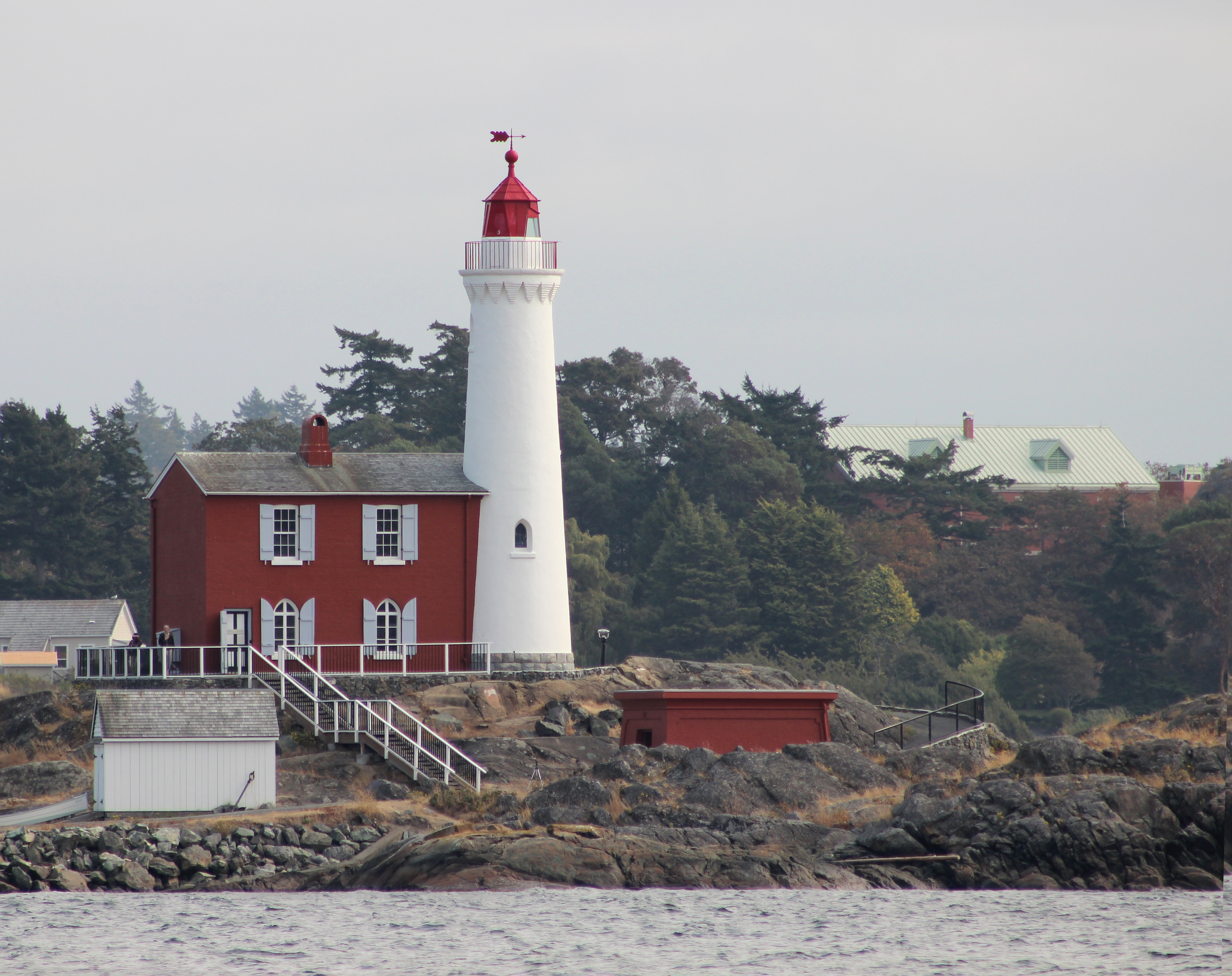
- Fisgard Lighthouse
- Location: Esquimalt Harbour, British Columbia, Canada
- Coordinates: 48°25′49.4″N 123°26′51.4″W

Tower
- Constructed: 1859–1860
- Foundation: granite
- Construction: bricks
- Automated: 1929
- Height: 14.6 m (48 ft)
- Shape: tapered cylindrical tower with balcony and lantern
- Markings: white tower, red lantern
- Operator: Parks Canada
- Heritage: National Historic Site of Canada; Classified Federal Heritage Building of Canada; Heritage Lighthouse

Light
- First lit: 16 November 1860
- Focal height: 21.6 m (71 ft)
- Lens: Fourth-order Fresnel lens
- Characteristic: Iso WR 4s.

National Historic Site of Canada
- Official name: Fisgard Lighthouse National Historic Site
- Designated: 3 November 1958
- Reference no.: 98

Fisgard Lighthouse National Historic Site, on Fisgard Island at the mouth of Esquimalt Harbour in Colwood, British Columbia, is the site of Fisgard Lighthouse, the first lighthouse on the west coast of Canada.

The lighthouse was constructed in 1859–60 by the British colonial government of the Colony of Vancouver Island, and it shone its first light on 16 November 1860. It was employed by twelve full-time lighthouse keepers, before being automated in 1929. It has remained in continuous operation, though a fire in 1957 put it out of commission for a year.

The light shows a white isophase light of 2 second period in a sector from 322° to 195° at 21.6 metres (71 ft) above mean sea level, and in other directions it shows red shutters. The white 14.6-metre (48 ft) tower is floodlit below balcony level.

It was formally recognized as a National Historic Site of Canada on 3 November 1958. An artificial causeway connecting it to Fort Rodd Hill National Historic Site was constructed in the 1950s, and the two sites are jointly administered by Parks Canada.

== History ==
=== Background ===
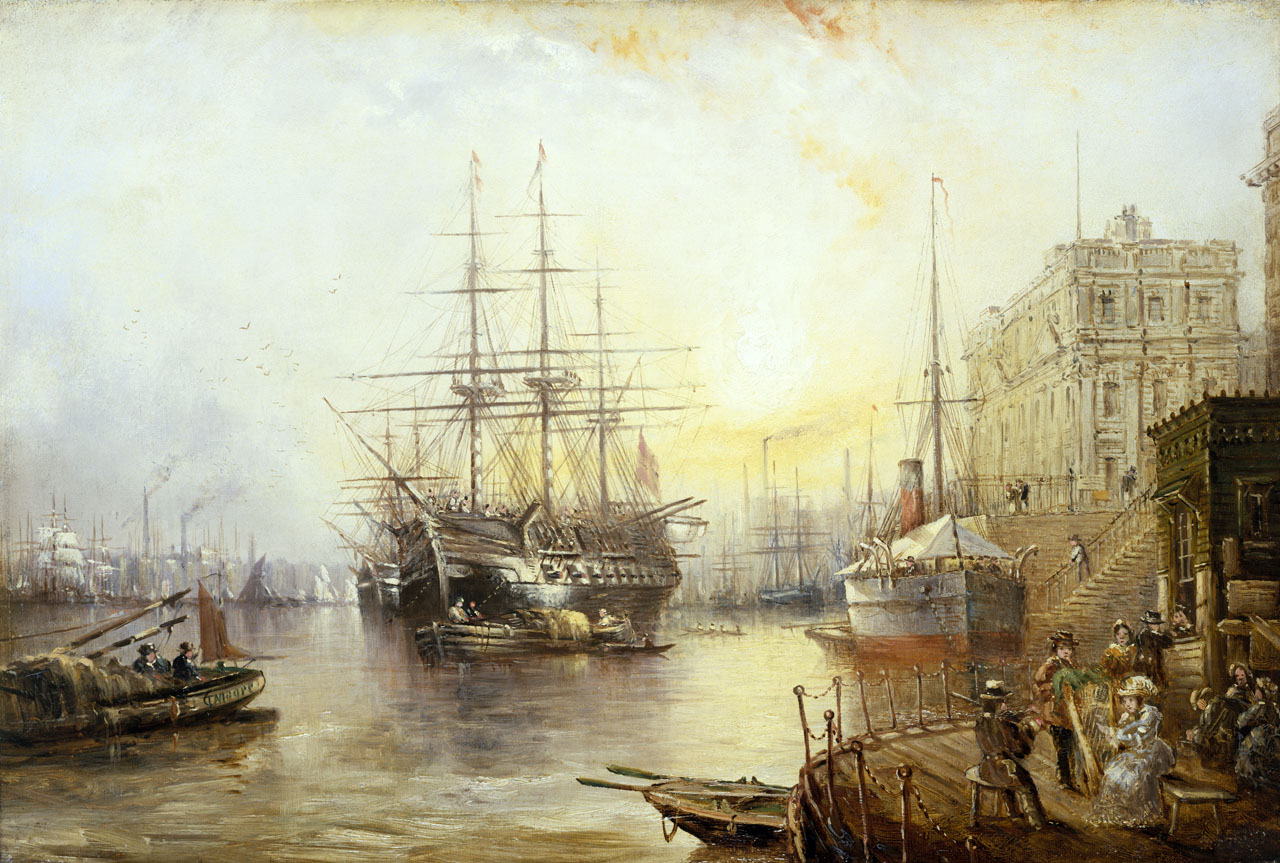
HMS Fisgard, namesake of the lighthouse, in 1877

Fisgard Lighthouse and its sister station Race Rocks Light, were constructed in 1859–60, to ease the movement of naval ships into Esquimalt Harbour and merchant ships into Victoria Harbour. The light stations were also seen as a significant political and fiduciary commitment on the part of the British government to the Colony of Vancouver Island, partly in response to the American gold miners flooding into the region: some 25,000 arrived in 1858 for the Fraser Gold Rush.

Colonial Governor James Douglas petitioned the British government to build the lighthouse. Captain George Richards supported his position, recommending the construction of a lighthouse at the mouth of Esquimalt Harbour. Fisgard Island, which had been named after HMS Fisgard, a British Navy ship that spent time in the Pacific and had surveyed the island in 1848, was chosen as the location for the new lighthouse.

=== Construction (1859 – 1860) ===
Architects John Wright and Hermann Otto Tiedemann designed the lighthouse and the picturesque gothic red brick residence adjoining it. Colonial surveyor and engineer Joseph Despard Pemberton was awarded the contract for the construction of the lighthouse. Excavation on Fisgard Island began September or October of 1859.

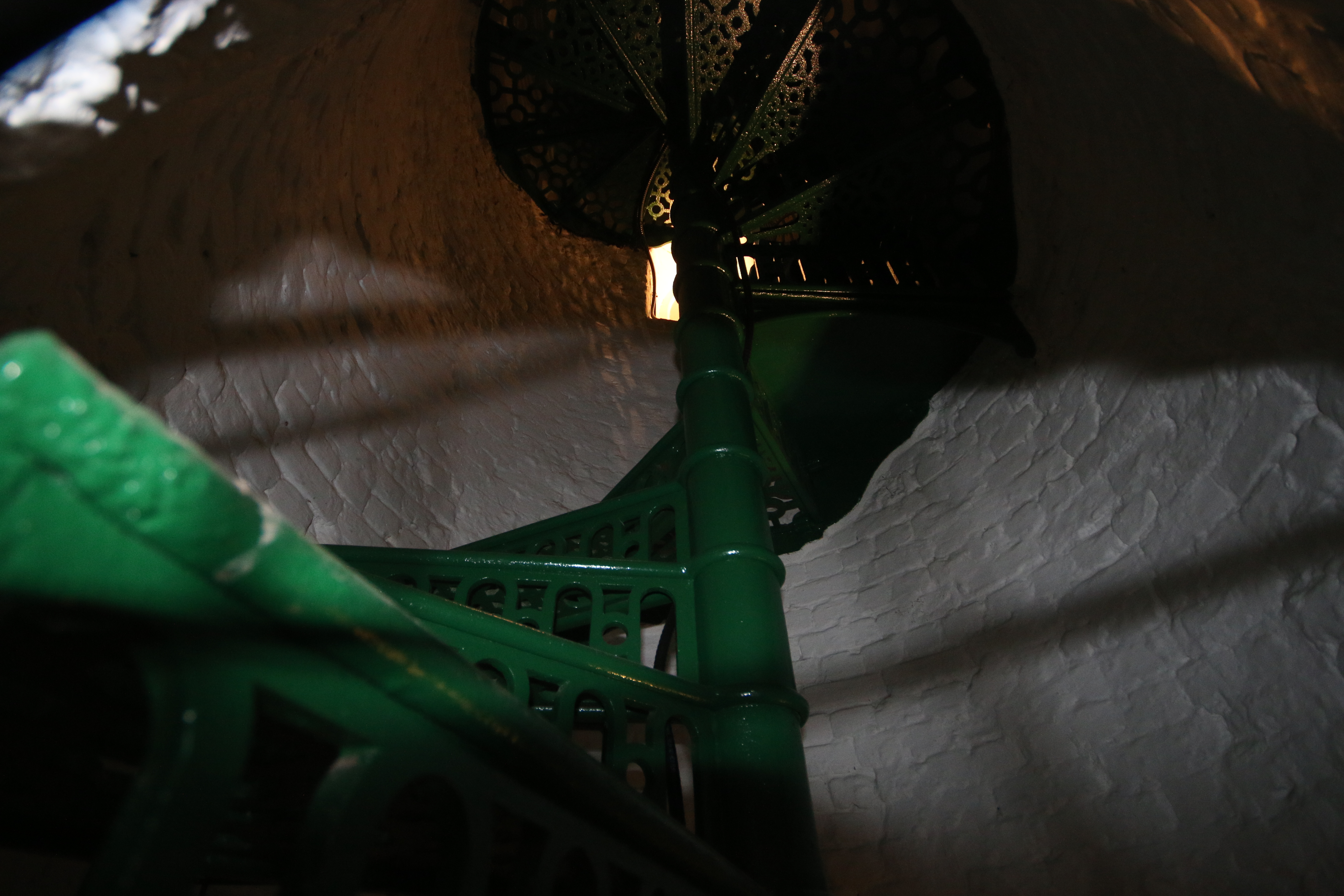
The cast-iron stairs inside the light tower

Local legend claims that the brick and stone used in construction were sent out from Britain as ballast; in fact local brick yards and quarries supplied these materials. Construction of the buildings was complete by June 1860.The lens, lamp apparatus and lantern room were accompanied from England by the first keeper, Mr. George Davies, in 1859. The cast-iron spiral staircase in the tower was made in sections in San Francisco.

=== Operation (1860 – 1928) ===
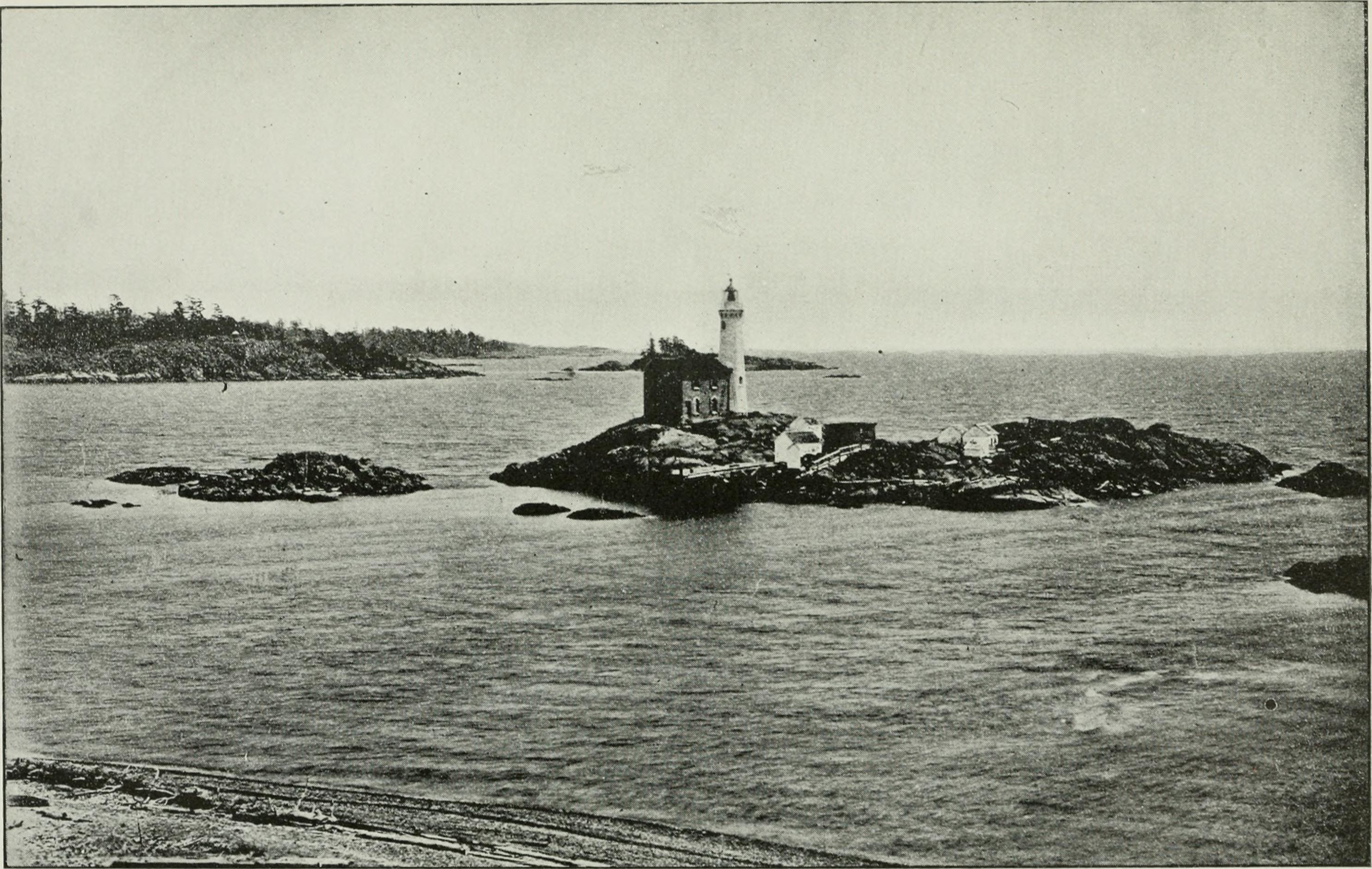
Fisgard Lighthouse from Fort Rodd Hill in 1903

Fisgard first showed a light from the tower at sunset on 16 November 1860.

Permanent steel shutters were added to the landward side of the lantern room some time after 1897, when concussion from the 6-inch guns at newly built Fort Rodd Hill caused cracks to appear in the lantern windows. The last keeper to actually live full-time at Fisgard was George Johnson; Josiah Gosse, Fisgard's final keeper, had permission from the lighthouse authority to live ashore (nearby on Esquimalt Lagoon), and row out to Fisgard every evening.

=== Later history ===
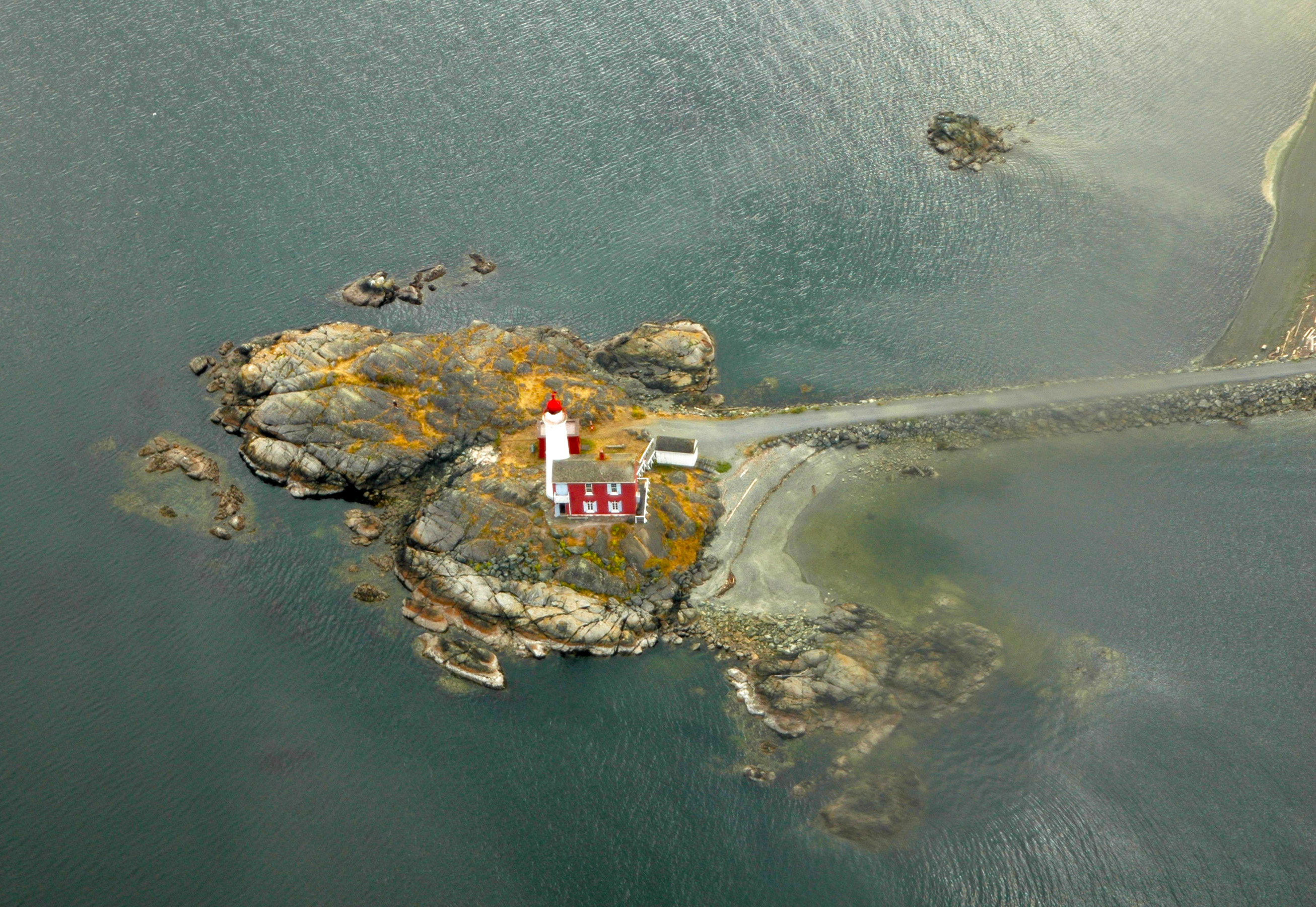
Aerial image of Fisgard Lighthouse on Fisgard Island, with artificial causeway visible

In the early 1940s, the acetylene lamp in Fisgard's tower was replaced by a battery-powered electric light. In 1950–51, a causeway was built out to Fisgard Island from the foreshore at Fort Rodd Hill by the Canadian Armed Forces; this was intended as a military obstacle, but also provided direct access to Fisgard Lighthouse.

In 1957, a fire in the lighthouse, possibly caused by vandalism, gutted the interior of the lighthouse, leaving only the checkered floors and steel staircase. The interior was restored, and the lighthouse and the keeper's dwellings declared a National Historic Site the following year, with Parks Canada assuming administration of the site.

== Light and access ==
A causeway from the adjacent Fort Rodd Hill National Historic Site provides access by land.

The former lighthouse keeper's residence is open to the public and contains displays and exhibits about the site's history. The attached tower is not open to the public as it is an operational aid to navigation.

== Historical designations ==
The lighthouse was designated a National Historic Site of Canada in 1958. It is also a Classified Federal Heritage Building.

== Keepers of Fisgard Lighthouse ==
Twelve people served as lighthouse keeper from 1860 until 1928:

- George Davies, 1860–1861
- John Watson, 1861
- William H. Bevis, 1861–1879 (Died on station, 1879)
- Amelia Bevis, 1879–1880
- Henry Cogan. 1880–1884
- Joseph Dare, 1884–1898 (Drowned in Esquimalt Harbour, 1898)
- W. Cormack, 1898
- John Davies, 1898
- Douglas MacKenzie, 1898–1900
- Andrew Deacon, 1900–1901
- George Johnson, 1901–1909
- Josiah Gosse, 1909–1928

== See also ==
- List of lighthouses in British Columbia
- List of lighthouses in Canada
- Fort Rodd Hill National Historic Site
- Race Rocks Light
