= Lucan Community Memorial Centre =

Lucan Biddulph Community Memorial Centre
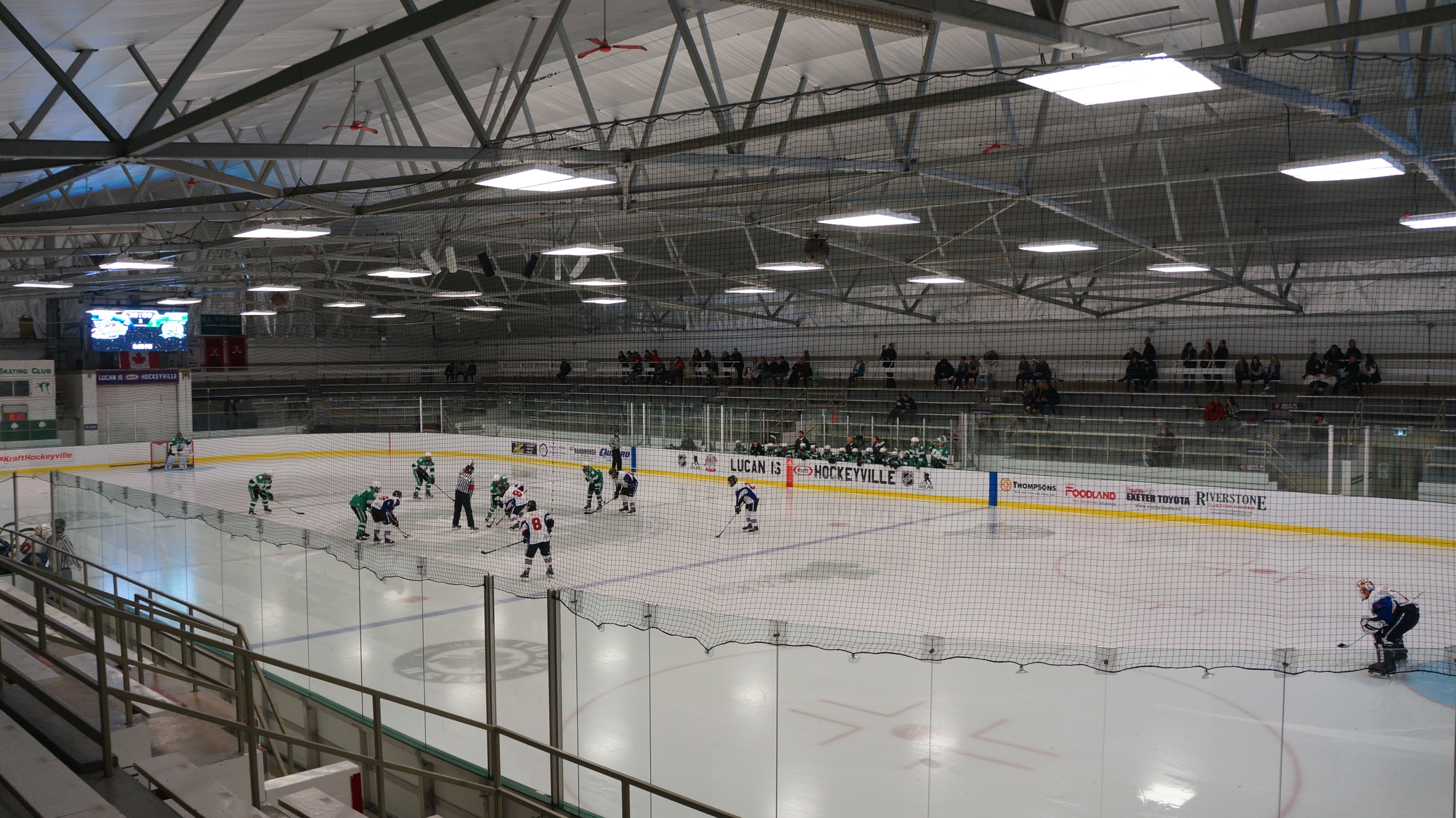
- Interactive map of Lucan Biddulph Community Memorial Centre
- Location: 263 Main Street; Lucan, ON N0M 2J0
- Coordinates: 43.1912°N 81.4111°W
- Owner: Township of Lucan Biddulph
- Capacity: 1,600

Construction
- Opened: 1971

Tenant
- Lucan Irish

Lucan Biddulph Community Memorial Centre is an indoor, 1,600 seat arena located in the township of Lucan Biddulph in Ontario, Canada.

== Ice hockey ==
The Lucan Irish of the Provincial Junior Hockey League and Lucan Minor Hockey are the main tenants of the arena.

On September 18, 2018, the arena hosted a pre-season National Hockey League game between the Toronto Maple Leafs and the Ottawa Senators as the city won that year's Kraft Hockeyville competition.
