= Clinton Arena =

Indoor arena in New York, United States

- Edward W. Stanley Recreation Center
- U.S. National Register of Historic Places
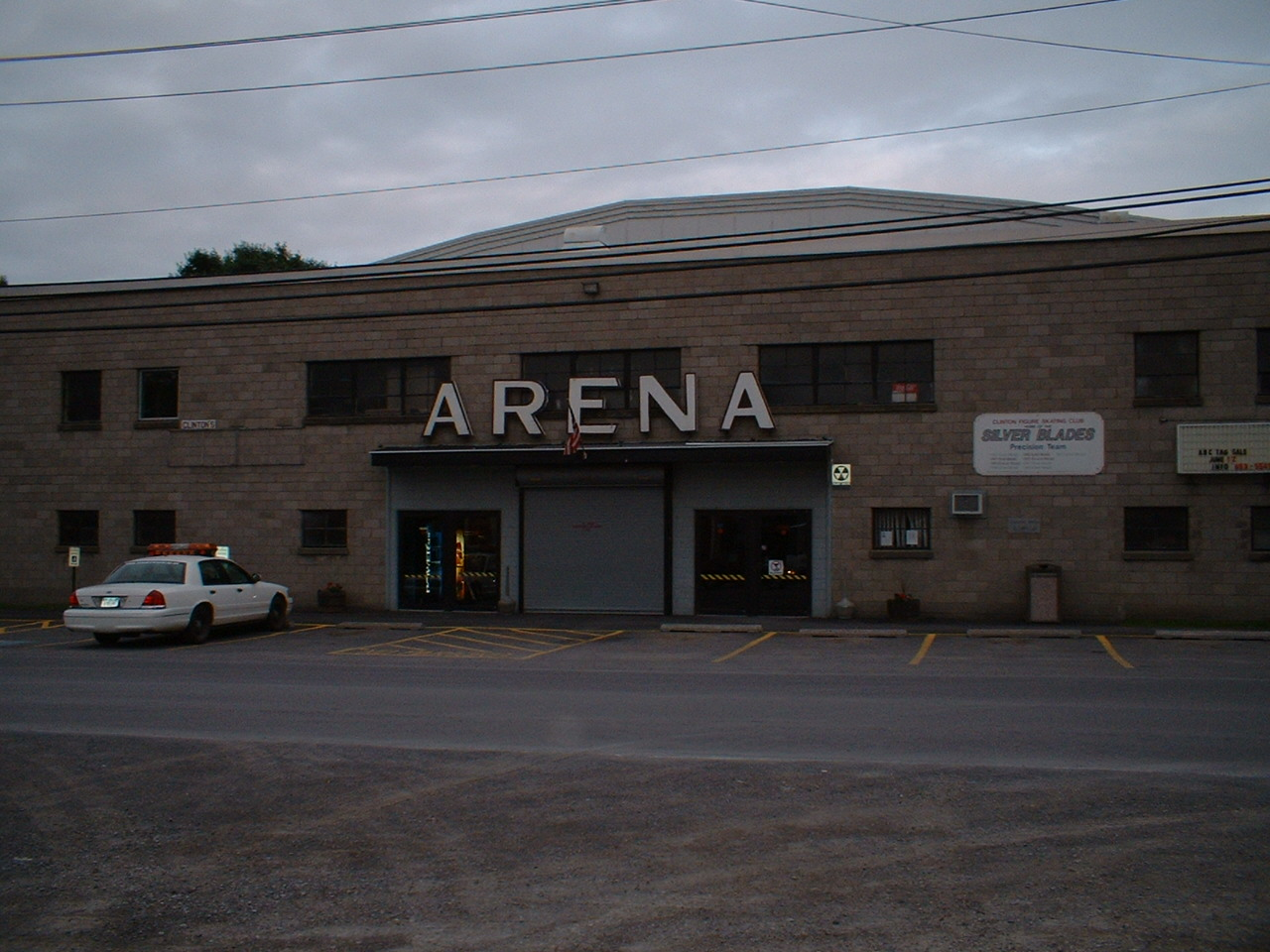
- The Clinton Arena, June 2004

- Location within New York Location within the United States
- Location: 36 Kirkland Avenue, Clinton, New York
- Coordinates: 43°3′11.03″N 75°22′40.76″W
- Area: 1.25 acres (0.51 ha)
- Built: 1954
- NRHP reference No.: 10000029
- Added to NRHP: February 17, 2010

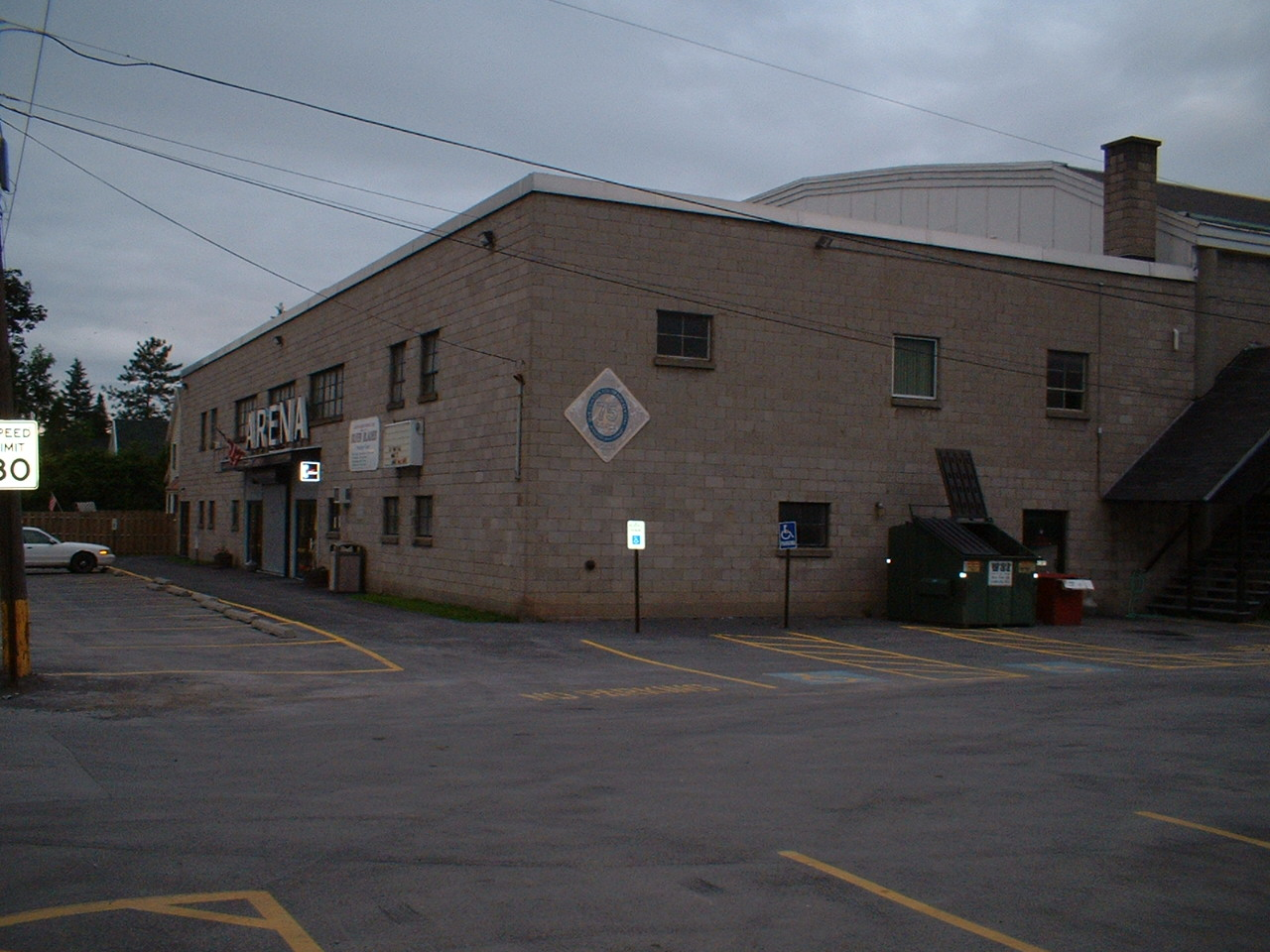
A side view of the Clinton Arena, June 2004

Clinton Arena, also known as Edward W. Stanley Recreation Center, is an indoor arena in Clinton, Oneida County, New York, United States, that is listed on the National Register of Historic Places.

== Description ==
Built in 1948-49, the arena burned down on September 11, 1953. It was then rebuilt in 1954. It is built of concrete block and is two stories high. It consists of two blocks: the entrance block containing locker rooms and offices, and the ice hockey rink block. The roof uses a Pennsylvania Truss system for support.

It hosted the Eastern Hockey League's Clinton Comets from 1954 to 1973. In 1977, portions of the movie Slap Shot were filmed in the arena. The arena seats 2,000 people and additional 300 standing room. The rink currently hosts the Clinton Central School hockey program, Clinton Youth Hockey, and the Clinton Figure Skating Club. In December 2006 Clinton Arena hosted the first annual "Hockey town" event between Hamilton College and Utica College.

The Clinton Arena is also home to the Clinton Figure Skating Club. It is one of the oldest figure skating clubs in the country and one of the largest on the East Coast. The club began as an informal group in 1948 following the construction of the Clinton Arena in Clinton, New York. Two years later, on August 14, 1950, Edward W. Stanley, one of the pioneers of the arena, initiated the first contact with the United States Figure Skating Association.

On April 14, 2018, the Clinton Arena won the Kraft Hockeyville U.S. Grand Prize. The arena received $150,000 in rink upgrades and hosted an NHL pre-season game between the Buffalo Sabres and the Columbus Blue Jackets.

It was listed on the National Register of Historic Places February 17, 2010.

== See also ==
- National Register of Historic Places listings in Oneida County, New York
