= Jack Kane (ice hockey) =

Canadian ice hockey player (1936–2025)

- Born: September 6, 1936 Toronto, Ontario, Canada
- Died: October 12, 2025 (aged 89) Rome, New York, U.S.
- Height: 5 ft 11 in (180 cm)
- Weight: 175 lb (79 kg; 12 st 7 lb)
- Position: Center
- Shot: Left
- Played for: Clinton Comets
- Playing career: 1953–1969

John Thomas Kane (September 6, 1936 – October 12, 2025) was a Canadian professional hockey center who played 820 games in the Eastern Hockey League for the Clinton Comets. He was inducted into the Greater Utica Sports Hall of Fame in 1997.

Kane died in Rome, New York on October 12, 2025, at the age of 89.
