= Edward Milne Community School =

Location
- 6218 Sooke Rd. Sooke, British Columbia, V9Z 1J1; Canada; 48.3884°N 123.6965°W

Information
- School type: Public, high school
- School board: School District 62 Sooke
- Principal: Mr. Mike Bobbitt
- Grades: 9-12
- Enrollment: Approximately 700
- Language: English/French
- Campus: Semi-rural
- Team name: Wolverines

Edward Milne Community School is one of three secondary schools in the School District 62 Sooke. It is located in Sooke, British Columbia, Canada. Roughly 700 students attend in grades 9 to 12 in both regular and French immersion programs. The school services the areas of Sooke, East Sooke, Jordan River, and Port Renfrew.

== Sports ==
EMCS has lots of opportunities for sports programs, such as Hockey Academy and Soccer Academy, as well as rugby, volleyball, and basketball teams.
