= Esquimalt Harbour =

Harbour in Greater Victoria, British Columbia, Canada

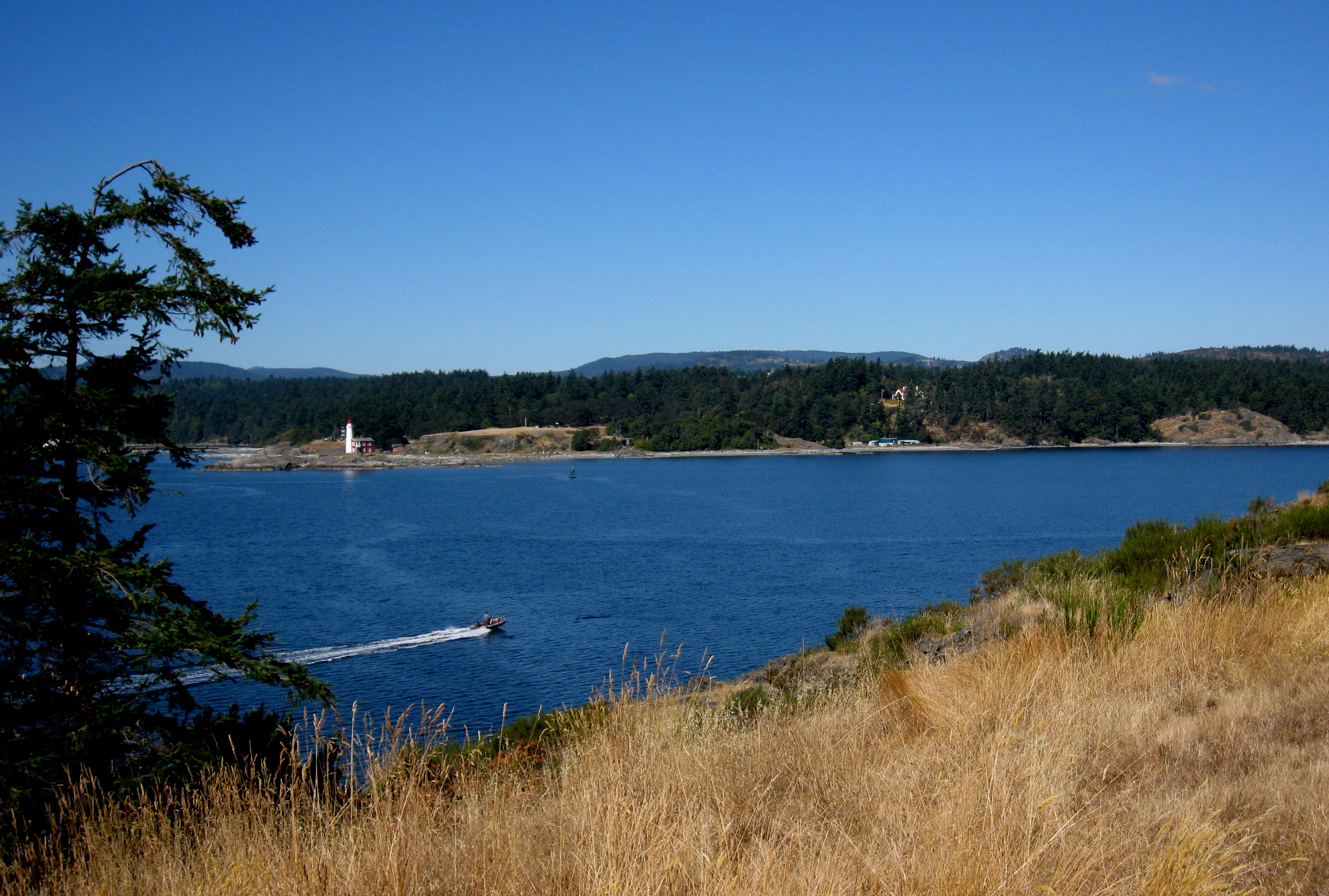
- Entrance to Esquimalt Harbour from CFB Esquimalt

- Location within British Columbia
- Location: Greater Victoria, British Columbia
- Coordinates: 48°26′00″N 123°26′00″W
- Type: Natural harbour
- Settlements: Colwood, Esquimalt, View Royal
- Website: Official website

Esquimalt Harbour is a natural harbour in Greater Victoria on the southern tip of Vancouver Island in British Columbia, Canada. The entrance to Esquimalt Harbour is from the south off the Strait of Juan de Fuca through a narrow channel known as Royal Roads. Esquimalt Harbour is situated west of Victoria Harbour, another major harbour in the region. Esquimalt Harbour is home to the Royal Canadian Navy's Maritime Forces Pacific, based at CFB Esquimalt.

Esquimalt Harbour is bounded by the municipalities of Colwood to the west, View Royal to the north, and Esquimalt to the east. The entrance is marked by the historic Fisgard Lighthouse on the Harbour's west shore in Colwood. CFB Esquimalt is situated at the harbour entrance's east shore.

== History ==
In the summer of 1790 Manuel Quimper, Gonzalo López de Haro, and Juan Carrasco aboard Princesa Real explored the Strait of Juan de Fuca where they claimed Esquimalt Harbour for Spain, naming it Puerto de Córdova.

From 1842 to 1905, the Royal Navy's Pacific Station was based at Esquimalt Royal Navy Dockyard. Control of the dockyard was transferred to the Canadian Department of Marine and Fisheries in 1905, who later transferred control of the dockyard to the Naval Service of Canada after its creation in 1910. The dockyards remains in use as HMC Dockyard Esquimalt at CFB Esquimalt, a Canadian Forces base built around the dockyards.

The King's Harbour Master (KHM) for CFB Esquimalt has served as the harbour authority for the entire Esquimalt Harbour since Transport Canada transferred responsibility of the harbour to the Department of National Defence. As a result, ship movement in Esquimalt Harbour requires the approval of the Esquimalt KHM.

Stothert & Pitt Ltd, Engineers of Bath, Somerset lists Esquimault Harbour as a place it supplied with special plant used in the harbour's construction, under the instruction of Messers Kinipple & Morris C.E. in its 1885 Machinery and Ironwork price-book.
