= School District 62 Sooke =

British Columbian school district

Location
- Langford Sooke, Colwood, Langford, Highlands, Metchosin and Port Renfrew on Vancouver Island Canada

District information
- Superintendent: Paul Block
- Deputy superintendent(s): Monica Braniff
- Chair of the board: Amanda Dowhy
- Schools: 29
- Budget: CA$233 million

Students and staff
- Students: 13250

Other information
- Website: www.sd62.bc.ca

Sooke School District 62 is a school district in British Columbia, Canada. It includes the suburbs of Victoria known as the Western Communities (or Westshore) as well as the mostly rural areas around the sea-side villages of Sooke and Port Renfrew. The District's Victoria suburbs include the municipalities of Colwood, Highlands, Langford, and parts of Metchosin.

In addition to a full range of academic offerings, the District is also home to the Sooke International Student Program, one of the first international student programs in all of British Columbia. The Sooke International Program enrolls students from South America, Europe and Asia. These students represent under 1% of the District's total student population.

== History ==
The school district in what today is the western suburbs of Victoria predates the formation of the Canadian province of British Columbia in mid 1871. The Metchosin School District was formed April 8, 1871. The Sooke School District was formed 23 May 1872 as one of the first school districts of the new province. The Highlands School District was formed in 1893 and incorporated into the Sooke School District in 1952.

== Schools ==
School	Location	Grades
Belmont Secondary School	Langford	9-12
Colwood Elementary School	Colwood	K-5
Crystal View Elementary School	Langford	K-5
Centre Mountain Lellum Middle School	Langford	6-8
David Cameron Elementary School	Colwood	K-5
Dunsmuir Middle School	Colwood	6-8
Ecole Poirier Elementary School	Sooke	K-5
Edward Milne Community School	Sooke	9-12
Hans Helgesen Elementary School	Metchosin	K-5
Happy Valley Elementary School	Langford	K-5
John Muir Elementary School	Sooke	K-5
École John Stubbs Memorial School	Colwood	K-8
Journey Middle School	Sooke	6-8
Lakewood Elementary School	Langford	K-5
Millstream Elementary School	Langford	K-5
Port Renfrew Elementary School	Port Renfrew	K-5
PEXSISEN Elementary School	Langford	K-5
Royal Bay Secondary School	Colwood	9-12
Ruth King Elementary School	Langford	K-5
Sangster Elementary School	Colwood	K-5
Saseenos Elementary School	Sooke	K-5
Savory Elementary School	Langford	K-5
SĆIȺNEW̱ SṮEȽIṮḴEȽ Elementary School	Langford	K-5
Sooke Elementary School	Sooke	K-5
Spencer Middle School	Langford	6-8
Westshore Secondary School	Langford	9-12
Willway Elementary School	Langford	K-5
Wishart Elementary School	Colwood	K-5

== See also ==
- List of school districts in British Columbia
