= Colwood, British Columbia =

Colwood
- City
- City of Colwood
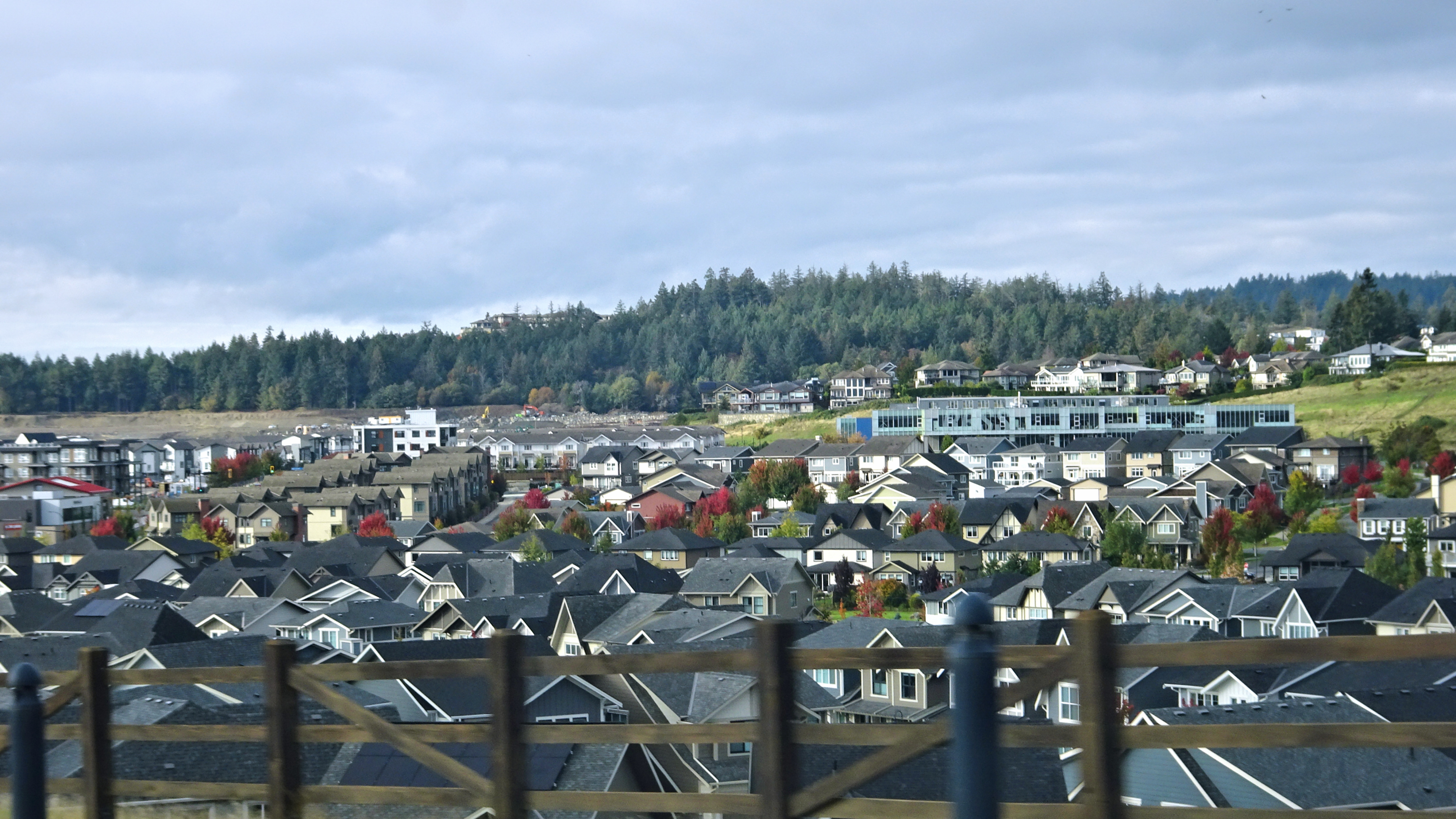
- Interactive map of Colwood
- Location on Vancouver Island Location in British Columbia
- Coordinates: 48°25′25″N 123°29′45″W
- Country: Canada
- Province: British Columbia
- Regional district: Capital
- Incorporated: 1985

Government
  - Governing body: Colwood City Council
  - Mayor: Doug Kobayashi
  - MP: Stephanie McLean (Liberal)
  - MLA: Darlene Rotchford (NDP)

Area
  - Land: 17.66 km^{2} (6.82 sq mi)
- Elevation: 80 m (260 ft)

Population (2021)
  - Total: 18,961
  - Density: 1,073.6/km^{2} (2,781/sq mi)
- Time zone: UTC−07:00 (PT)
- Postal code: V9B, V9C
- Area codes: 250, 778, 236, 672
- Highways: Highway 1A; Highway 14
- Website: www.colwood.ca

Colwood is a city on Vancouver Island to the southwest of Victoria, capital of British Columbia, Canada. Colwood was incorporated in 1985 and has a population of approximately 19,000 people. Colwood lies within the boundaries of the Greater Victoria area or Capital Regional District, in a region called the Western Communities, or the West Shore. Set along more than 5 kilometres (3.1 mi) of oceanfront, this fast-growing seaside community is one of the 13 component municipalities of Greater Victoria.

== History ==
A small plaque erected in 1972 on a concrete cairn in the shore of the Esquimalt Lagoon outlines its history:

Royal Roads - To seaward lies an anchorage or roadstead first used in 1790 by the Spanish and named in 1846 for its location between Albert Head and Victoria. Unloading place for large vessels serving Victoria in days of sail, it was once a scene of disaster. On April 1, 1883, a southeasterly gale swept the haven, beaching the ships Southern Chief, Gettysburg, Connaught, and Tiger. Erected by the Thermopylae Club.

Colwood was originally one of four large farms established by the Hudson's Bay Company in the 1850s to supply the steadily increasing population of Fort Victoria.

In 1851, the Puget Sound Agricultural Company, a subsidiary of the Hudson's Bay Company, appointed Capt. Edward E. Langford 'bailiff' of the 600 acre Esquimalt Farm lying between Esquimalt Harbour and the present Langford Lake. The farmhouse was called 'Colwood' after his home in Sussex, England. The first stone dairy on the island was built on this farm as was a lime kiln, homestead and barn. Kanakas (Hawaiian Islanders) were employed as shepherds for the herd of Southdown sheep. Mrs. Langford gave birth to the first white male child born in the colony. Capt. Langford's sister opened a School for Young Ladies at 'Colwood' Farm.

In 1860, Fisgard Lighthouse was constructed at the mouth of Esquimalt Harbour. It was 14 metres (47 ft) high, and visible for 10 nautical miles. In 1950, it was connected by a causeway to the shore at the base of Fort Rodd Hill.

1863: A sawmill was opened on Colwood Creek above the Indian burial site on Esquimalt Lagoon, on what is now Royal Roads University land. John Gilmore owned the sawmill.

1874: The original Colwood school was built on Sooke Road on land donated by Arthur Peatt, a local farmer. The building was later transferred across the road and became the home of the Ross family.

1892: William John Wale leased the old 600-acre Colwood Farm for the sum of $400 per year.

1895: Fort Rodd Hill installation was armed. The Fort guarded the entrance to the Royal Navy yards at Esquimalt. The original Colwood Hotel was burned down and a two-story framed, square-shaped building was rebuilt by the proprietor, Mr Campbell. He later enlarged the building and sold it to Mrs Miller, who became the owner of the Goldstream Inn.

1910: Colwood Women's Institute formed.

== Geography ==
As it lies geographically to the south of Victoria, Colwood is Western Canada's southernmost city.

Neighbourhoods of Colwood:

- Colwood Corners
- Belmont Park
- Royal Roads
- Colwood Lake
- Hatley Park
- Colwood Creek
- Triangle Mountain
- Wishart
- Latoria
- Lagoon Beach
- Royal Beach
- Royal Bay

== Demographics ==
In the 2021 Census of Population conducted by Statistics Canada, Colwood had a population of 18,961 living in 7,428 of its 7,688 total private dwellings, a change of 12.5% from its 2016 population of 16,859. With a land area of 17.66 km^{2} (6.82 sq mi), it had a population density of 1,073.7/km^{2} (2,780.8/sq mi) in 2021.

The median household income in 2015 for Colwood was $85,688, which is above the British Columbia provincial average of $69,995.

Historical census populations – Colwood, British Columbia

Year	Pop.	±%
1986	11,432	—
1991	13,468	+17.8%
1996	13,848	+2.8%
2001	13,745	−0.7%

Year	Pop.	±%
2006	14,687	+6.9%
2011	16,093	+9.6%
2016	16,859	+4.8%
2021	18,961	+12.5%

Source: Statistics Canada

=== Ethnicity ===
Panethnic groups in the City of Colwood (2001−2021)
Panethnic group	2021		2016		2011		2006		2001	
Panethnic group	Pop.	%	Pop.	%	Pop.	%	Pop.	%	Pop.	%
European (Note: Statistic includes all persons that did not make up part of a visible minority or an indigenous identity.)	15,885	84.54%	14,635	87.53%	14,575	91.07%	13,585	92.57%	12,785	93.15%
Indigenous	925	4.92%	840	5.02%	675	4.22%	445	3.03%	275	2%
East Asian (Note: Statistic includes total responses of "Chinese", "Korean", and "Japanese" under visible minority section on census.)	620	3.3%	500	2.99%	200	1.25%	255	1.74%	315	2.3%
Southeast Asian (Note: Statistic includes total responses of "Filipino" and "Southeast Asian" under visible minority section on census.)	445	2.37%	255	1.53%	240	1.5%	45	0.31%	85	0.62%
South Asian	280	1.49%	155	0.93%	115	0.72%	140	0.95%	110	0.8%
African	230	1.22%	110	0.66%	75	0.47%	120	0.82%	50	0.36%
Latin American	185	0.98%	140	0.84%	50	0.31%	25	0.17%	30	0.22%
Middle Eastern (Note: Statistic includes total responses of "West Asian" and "Arab" under visible minority section on census.)	115	0.61%	30	0.18%	25	0.16%	10	0.07%	50	0.36%
Other/multiracial (Note: Statistic includes total responses of "Visible minority, n.i.e." and "Multiple visible minorities" under visible minority section on census.)	100	0.53%	60	0.36%	35	0.22%	35	0.24%	20	0.15%
Total responses	18,790	99.1%	16,720	99.18%	16,005	99.45%	14,675	99.92%	13,725	99.85%
Total population	18,961	100%	16,859	100%	16,093	100%	14,687	100%	13,745	100%
Note: Totals greater than 100% due to multiple origin responses.

=== Religion ===
According to the 2021 census, religious groups in Colwood included:

- Irreligion (11,685 persons or 62.2%)
- Christianity (6,410 persons or 34.1%)
- Islam (145 persons or 0.8%)
- Buddhism (115 persons or 0.6%)
- Judaism (90 persons or 0.5%)
- Hinduism (80 persons or 0.4%)
- Sikhism (40 persons or 0.2%)
- Other (220 persons or 1.2%)

== Attractions ==
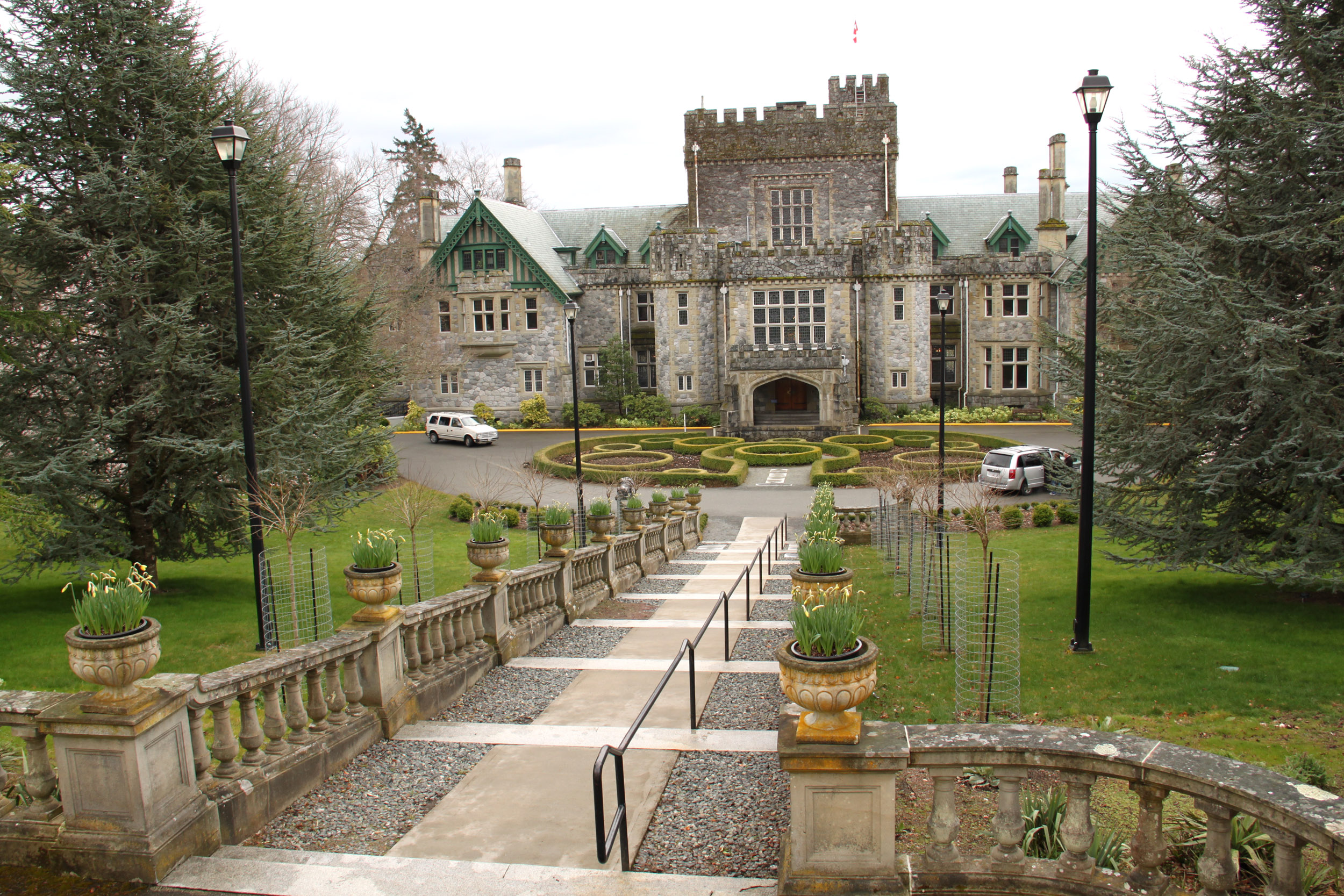
Hatley Castle

Colwood is home to abundant forests, parks and trails, as well as several historic sites including Fort Rodd Hill, Fisgard Lighthouse and Hatley Castle.

One of Colwood's best known landmarks is Hatley Castle, now home to Royal Roads University. It is a Scottish Baronial mansion and grounds originally built as a residence for James Dunsmuir, Premier and later Lieutenant Governor of British Columbia. Colwood almost became the seat of the Crown of the Commonwealth realm in 1940, when, after the start of World War II, the government planned to relocate King George VI, Queen Elizabeth, and their children, Princesses Elizabeth and Margaret, to the castle for protection. But they decided to stay in London and Windsor, near the European front. The government transferred the estate to the Canadian Armed Forces. It adapted the site for use as Royal Roads Military College, a naval training facility from 1941-mid-1990s. The military college was closed in the 1990s, and the estate is now the campus of the public Royal Roads University, which opened in 1995. The original residence is surrounded by extensive formal gardens, including a featured Japanese garden.

The Fisgard Lighthouse in Colwood is one of Canada's National Historic Sites. There hasn't been a keeper here since the light was automated in 1929, but every year many thousands of visitors step inside a real 19th century light and capture some of the feeling of ships wrecked and lives saved. Built by the British in 1860, when Vancouver Island was not yet part of Canada, Fisgard's red brick house and white tower has stood faithfully at the entrance to Esquimalt Harbour. Once a beacon for the British Royal Navy's Pacific Squadron, today Fisgard still marks home base for the Maritime Forces Pacific of the Royal Canadian Navy.

Colwood is also home to historic Fort Rodd Hill, another Canadian National Historic Site. Built by the British in the 1890s, this coast artillery fort was designed to defend Victoria and the Esquimalt Naval Base. Visitors come to explore the three gun batteries, underground magazines, command posts, guardhouses, barracks and searchlight emplacements that are the vestiges of a bygone era. Set on a wide open waterfront park near the Fisgard Lighthouse, visitors can see the sea and mountain views, go for bird watches and investigate the tide pools along the shoreline.

The city has many regional amenities, including the City's waterfront at Esquimalt Lagoon, which includes a National Migratory Bird Sanctuary, the Juan de Fuca Recreation Centre, The Q Centre, Royal Colwood Golf Club, Olympic View Golf Club, and the library facilities for the Western Communities.

== Education ==
Colwood is a part of the School District 62 Sooke. There are six elementary schools: John Stubbs (in Belmont Park), Colwood, Hans Helgesen, David Cameron, Sangster, and Wishart. There is one middle school: Dunsmuir. There is also an alternative school program called Pacific Secondary School (formerly WON western opportunity network). A new high school, Royal Bay Secondary School, opened in 2015.

Colwood is also home to Royal Roads University.

== See also ==
- List of francophone communities in British Columbia
