= Colwood, West Sussex =

Village in West Sussex, England

Coordinates: 51°00′18″N 0°13′36″W

Colwood is a village near Warninglid in West Sussex, England. It is the site of Colwood Manor.
