= Pointe-au-Père National Wildlife Area =

National Wildlife Reserve in Quebec, Canada

- Réserve nationale de faune de Pointe-au-Père
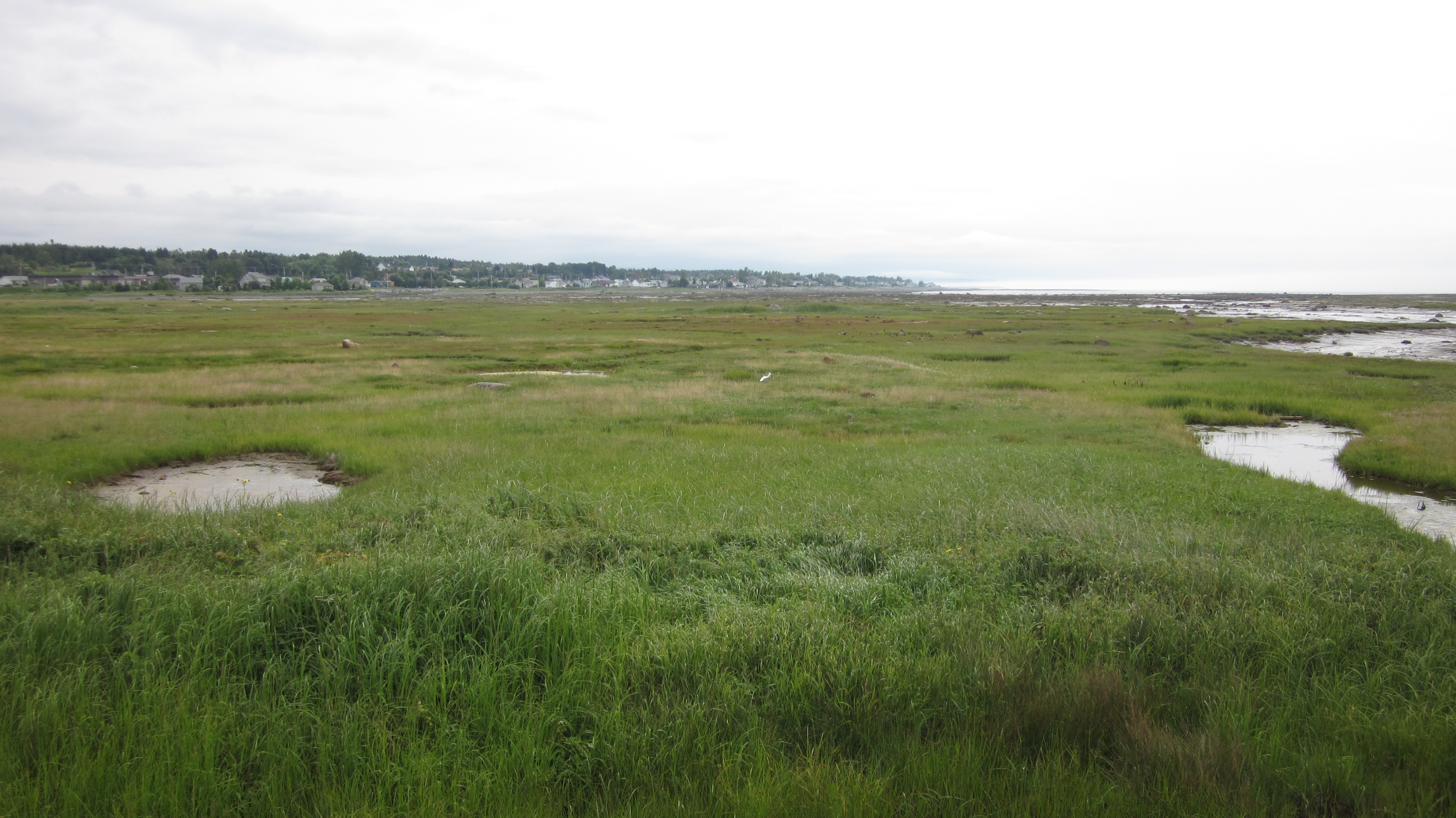
- Pointe-au-Père National Wildlife Area

- Location within Quebec
- Type: National Wildlife Area
- Location: Rimouski, Bas-Saint-Laurent region, Québec province, Canada
- Coordinates: 48°30′30″N 68°28′0″W
- Area: 0.0772204 sq mile
- Created: 1986
- Owner: Rimouski-Neigette Regional County Municipality
- Administrator: Canadian Wildlife Service
- Status: WCPA: III (Natural monument) WDPA: 555637853
- Website: https://www.canada.ca/fr/environnement-changement-climatique/services/reserves-nationales-faune/existantes/pointe-au-pere.html

The Pointe-au-Père National Wildlife Area is one of eight National Wildlife Areas of Canada located in Quebec. This small 23-hectare area protects a spartina marsh located in the Pointe-au-Père sector of the city of Rimouski. In addition to the marsh, it includes an eelgrass meadow. Despite its small size, it is frequented by over 120 species of birds, including snow geese, Barrow's goldeneye, least sandpiper and greater yellowlegs. It was created in 1986 following pressure from a group of residents to protect the marsh. It is administered by the Canadian Wildlife Service.

== Geography ==
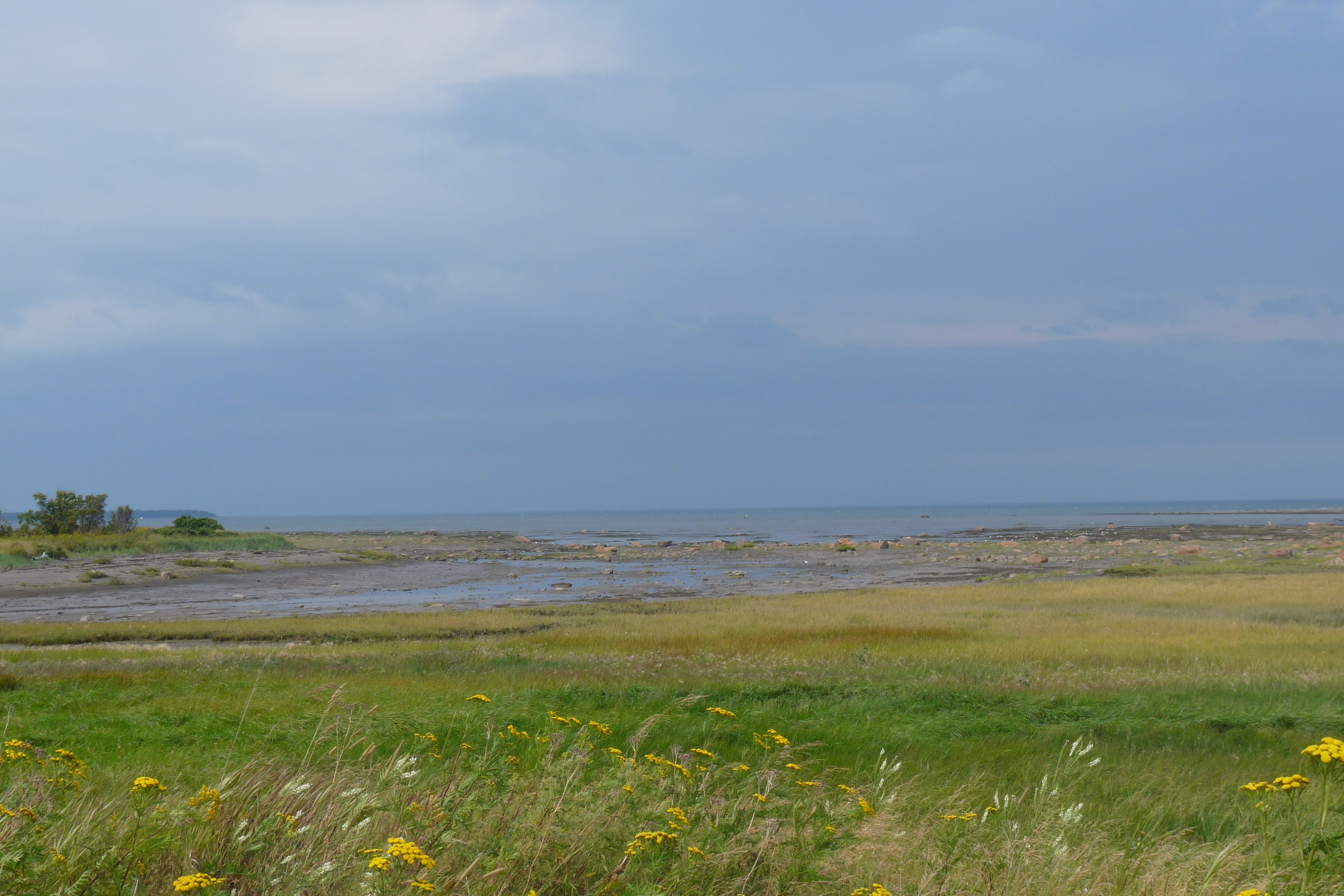
Mouth of the Sainte-Anne River

The NWA covers an area of 23.7 ha, including 1.46 ha in the marine environment. It is located five kilometers east of downtown Rimouski, and its territory lies entirely within the city of Rimouski, in the Pointe-au-Père sector.

The Sainte-Anne River flows through the reserve from east to west. A large part of the reserve is a spartina marsh with several mudflats. The latter is protected from the St. Lawrence River by a rocky headland. The reserve's bedrock is part of the Trois-Pistoles formation. Much of the marsh is flooded during spring and autumn-spring tides. This Upper Cambrian and Lower Ordovician formation is composed of sandstone, conglomerate, siltstone and slate.

=== Weather ===
The reserve has a subpolar subhumid continental climate. The average temperature in Rimouski is -11.7 °C in January and 18.2 °C in July. The city receives an average of 642 mm of rain and 271.7 cm of snow per year. The territory has a frost-free period of 262 days. Although in a continental zone, temperatures are nevertheless influenced by the St. Lawrence estuary. In summer, coastal temperatures are four to five degrees Celsius lower than inland. In winter, the difference can sometimes be as much as 10 °C.

Rimouski Meteorological Survey
Months	Jan	Feb	Mar	Apr	May	Jun	Jul	Aug	Sept	Oct	Nov	Dec	Year
Average minimum temperatures (°C)	−15,7	−14,2	−8,3	−1,2	4,7	10,2	13,1	12,1	7,7	2,7	−3,2	−11,2	−0,3
Average temperatures (°C)	−11,7	−10,1	−4,2	2,7	9,7	15,4	18,2	16,9	12	6,1	−0,3	−7,7	3,9
Average minimum temperatures (°C)	−7,5	−6	−0,2	6,6	14,6	20,7	23,2	21,7	16,2	9,5	2,5	−4,1	8,1
Precipitation (mm)	68,4	58,1	64,1	65,7	83,5	79,2	88,8	86	80,5	84,5	73,8	82,4	915
of which snow (cm)	58,8	50,4	43,2	20	1	0	0	0	0	2,6	29,3	66,4	271,7
Source : Environment and Climate Change Canada

== Natural environment ==
According to the Commission for Environmental Cooperation, the park is located in the Northern Appalachian and Maritime Plateau Level III ecoregion of the northern forests. The Canadian ecological framework includes the inland portion of the Appalachian ecoregion. Its climate is characterized by warm summers and cold, snowy winters. Its vegetation consists of a mixed forest dominated by sugar maple, American beech and yellow birch in the higher regions, and eastern hemlock, white pine, balsam fir and white spruce in the lower sections. Finally, according to the World Wildlife Fund, it is located in the New England/Acadia Forest Ecoregion.

The NWA is part of the Rimouski Important Bird Area (IBA), for its concentrated waterfowl population. The IBA covers an area of 47.71 km^{2}, corresponding to the south shore of the St. Lawrence River between the Rocher-Blanc sector upstream and Pointe-au-Père downstream. It includes Rimouski Bay, Île Canuel and Île Saint-Barnabé. A key feature of the IBA is the presence of a gradient marsh, unique in eastern Quebec, offering a wide variety of habitats, including rocky shores, mudflats, salt marshes, beaches and eelgrass beds.

=== Flora ===
The salt marshes that make up the reserve are mainly populated by salt hay (Spartina patens), sloughgrass (Spartina pectinata), red fescue (Festuca rubra) and chaffy sedge (Carex paleacea). Other plants typical of estuarine environments include sea pea (Lathyrus japonicus), Scottish licorice-root (Ligusticum scoticum), American searocket (Cakile edentula) and sea milkwort (Lysimachia maritima). In submerged areas, the flora is dominated by eelgrass (Zostera marina).

=== Fauna ===
The reserve is home to 120 species of birds. In spring, it is a staging area for around 25,000 snow geese (Chen caerulescens). Also in spring, the reserve is visited by around 150 Barrow's goldeneyes (Bucephala islandica), 1,000 Least sandpipers and 250 Greater yellowlegs (Tringa melanoleuca). It is also visited by a significant population of short-billed dowitcher (Limnodromus griseus).

It is a feeding ground for the great blue heron (Ardea herodias), black-crowned night heron (Nycticorax nycticorax) and brent goose (Branta bernicla). In summer, it's a nesting ground for some 15 bird species, including American black duck (Anas rubripes), mallard (Anas platyrhynchos), northern pintail (Anas acuta) and green-winged teal (Anas carolinensis). Also found here are red-winged blackbird (Agelaius phoeniceus), Wilson's snipe (Gallinago delicata) and swamp sparrow (Zonotrichia georgiana).

In autumn, it is a staging area for red-throated loons (Gavia stellata), common loons (Gavia immer), Canada geese (Branta canadensis), sanderlings (Calidris alba), semipalmated sandpipers (Calidris pusilla) and white-rumped sandpipers (Calidris fuscicollis).

Despite its small size, the reserve is home to a dozen mammal species, including the muskrat (Ondatra zibethicus), common shrew (Sorex cinereus), Meadow jumping mouse (Zapus hudsonius) and field vole (Microtus pennsylvanicus).

== History ==
The first efforts to protect the salt marsh date back to 1978, when a group of birdwatchers noticed the damage caused to the natural site by landfill and sand removal. These interventions were compounded by the recurring problem of illegal hunting in the marsh. The group entrusted one of their members, Jean-Pierre Fillion, with the task of raising public awareness of the marsh. They all realized that the ecological integrity of the marsh, which until then had been fairly well preserved, was in danger of being compromised, which would undoubtedly have a negative impact on the presence of the birds that frequent it. The marsh site has long been a meeting place for birdwatchers in the region, who take advantage of the site's ecological richness and the presence of several bird species, with a survey carried out in the late 1970s recording the presence of 102 different bird species.

On behalf of the Regroupement pour la conservation du marais de Pointe-au-Père (which foreshadowed the creation of the Club des Ornitholoques du Bas-Saint-Laurent), Mr. Fillion organized information meetings, photo exhibitions, and the publishing of reports in the local media to raise awareness of the marsh and its ecological importance among residents of the Rimouski region. He also lobbied federal, provincial, and municipal governments to protect the site. In 1980, he handed over to Michel Larivée, who continued the work of raising awareness. In 1982, having become Director of the Musée de la Mer de Pointe-au-Père, Mr. Fillion took up the project again and made it one of the Museum's mandates, reserving one of his exhibition rooms for the enhancement of the salt marsh and offering guided tours during the tourist season.

In 1986, the Canadian government officially created the reserve as the "Pointe-au-Père National Wildlife Area".

== Administration and tourism ==
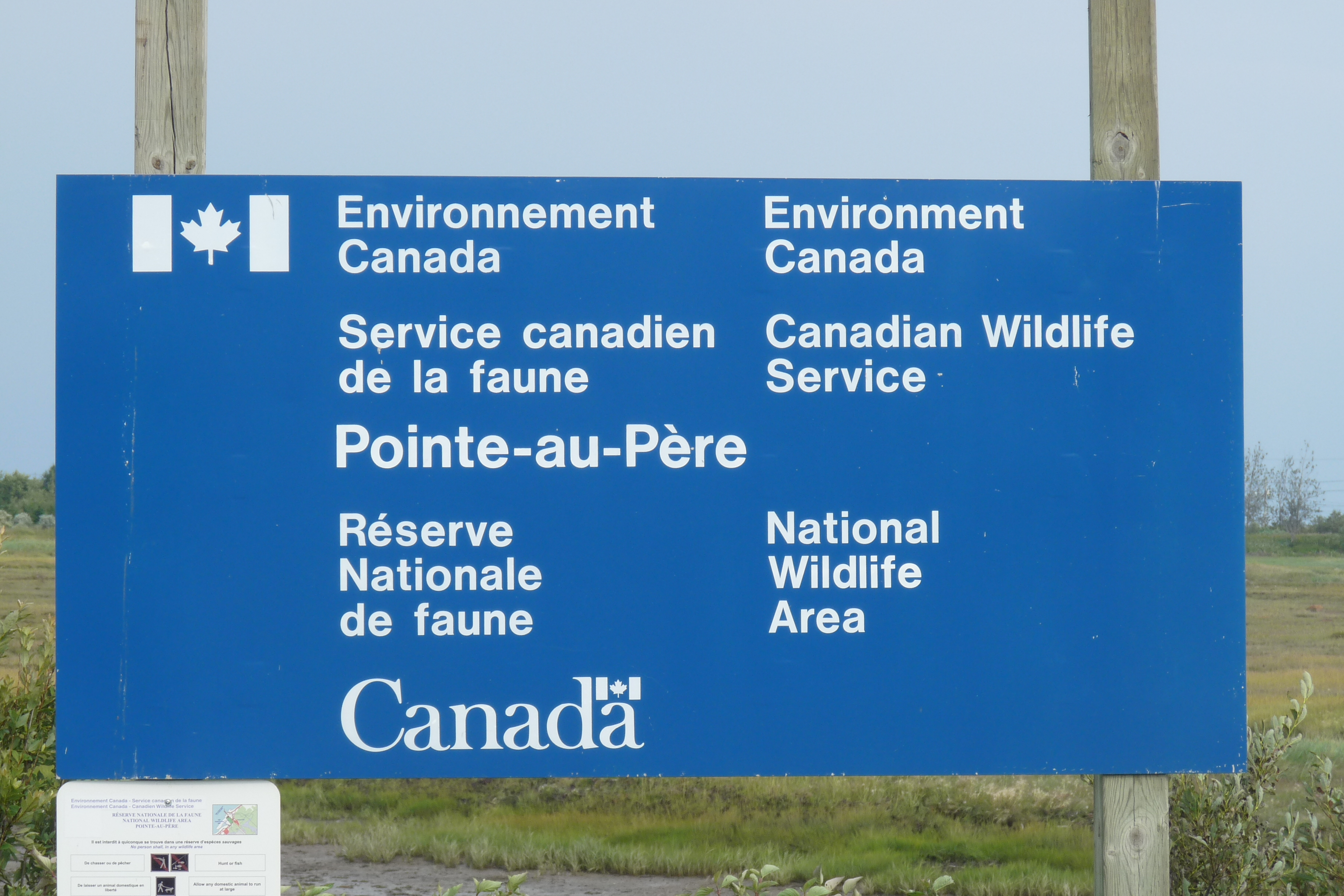
Sign indicating the boundary of the Pointe-au-Père National Wildlife Area.

The reserve is administered by the Canadian Wildlife Service, a division of Environment Canada. The most important infrastructure dedicated to tourism in the reserve is a 500 m trail, and the only activities permitted are hiking, nature observation, and photography. Access is permitted only in areas set aside for this purpose. A rest area and interpretation panels on marine biology were installed in the northern sector of the reserve in 2012 to "raise visitor awareness of the fragility of the environment and reduce disturbance of birds by kayakers and hikers".

== Appendix ==
=== Related articles ===
- National Wildlife Area
- Important Bird Area
- Canadian Wildlife Service
- Environment and Climate Change Canada
- Pointe-au-Père
- Rimouski

=== Bibliography ===
- ^{(fr)} Marie-Andrée Massicotte et al., Une lumière sur la côte, Pointe-au-Père, 1882–1982, Rimouski, Corporation des fêtes du centenaire de Pointe-au-Père, 1982, 461 p. (OCLC 15983265)
- ^{(fr)} Nature Québec, ZICO de Rimouski : la mer en ville! Conservation Plan, Québec, 2012, 98 p. (ISBN 978-2-923731-63-6, read online archive)
- ^{(fr)} Environment and Climate Change Canada, Pointeau-Père National Wildlife Area: 2018 Management Plan, Gatineau, 2018, 58 p. (ISBN 978-0-660-07599-0, read online archive).

=== External links ===
- Official website archive
