= Columbia National Wildlife Area =

Protected natural area in British Columbia, Canada

- IUCN category Ia (strict nature reserve)
- Location within British Columbia
- Location: British Columbia, Canada
- Coordinates: 50°54′20″N 116°23′20″W
- Area: 1,007 ha (2,490 acres)
- Designation: National Wildlife Area
- Established: 1978
- Governing body: Canadian Wildlife Service
- Website: Columbia NWA

Located in the southern part of British Columbia, Columbia National Wildlife Area was established to protect its wetlands and as a temporary home for migratory birds travelling to South America. The National Wildlife Area (NWA) is divided into four unit areas: Wilmer, Spillimacheen, Brisco and Harrogate, which are home to many diverse species of animals and plants which are significant in Canada.

The National Wildlife Area (NWA) permits seasonal activities that involve hiking and canoeing. On spring time around May, a bird festival called The Wings Over the Rockies is a good time to witness the NWA scenery and habitat.

== Geography/topography ==
Columbia NWA is made up of 4 separate units: Wilmer, Spillimacheen, Brisco, and Harrogate. It is located in the Southern Rocky Mountain Trench of southeastern British Columbia and nestled between the Rocky Mountains to the east and the Purcell and Selkirk mountains to the west.

The NWA contains wetlands and lowland coniferous forest, as part of a larger wetland system. It is the "Columbia Wetlands" which have a great diversity and variety of wildlife. In particular, they are important resting and breeding habitats for waterfowl and migratory birds of the Pacific Flyway. To protect critical wetland habitat for migratory birds, it was created as a protected area in 1978 by the Canadian Wildlife Service (CWS).

Consequently, NWA plays a key role in preserving this unique habitat for the benefit of waterfowl and other wildlife.

== History ==
In the past, prior to European settlement, it was inhabited by two First Nations groups: the Kinbasket Shuswap and the Ktunaxa. The Shuswap Nation were semi-nomadic hunters who seasonally fished for salmon along the northern reaches of the Columbia River. The Ktunaxa people, on the other hand, were a hunter-gatherer society with a long history of inter-tribal trade in interior BC as well as east of the Rockies with tribes such as the Blackfoot and Cree Nations.

Due to the geographic seclusion of this area, the Ktunaca were one of the last tribes in Canada who contacted early European settlers. This enabled fur trade to prosper, which was the sole industry allowing the Ktunaxa and Scuswap to maintain their traditional lives.

The expansion of the Canadian Pacific Railway led to increasing mining and forestry, bringing prominent irrigation technologies and agricultural activities to the area.

In the 1800s-1900s, as the industries developed, a demand for residential development and recreational areas was growing. With this trend, recognizing the region's wetlands for migratory bird species became important, officials established a Provincial Game Management Reserve in 1947, led by the present-day CWS.

== Species ==
As the topography of Columbia National Wildlife Area consists of various coniferous forests and wetlands, their flora and fauna include a great diversity of animal species and plants enclosed with riparian habitats and various shrubs. Some of the wetland species residing in Columbia National Wildlife Area are bull trout and westslope cutthroat trout. This is accompanied with a community of reptiles and amphibians as well, namely the rubber boa and leopard frog. Aquatic plants can be seen within these wetlands, such as the yellow pond-lily and fennel-leaved pondweed. The NWA's wetlands are also vital habitat for waterfowl breeding and migration. A variety of mammals like wolves, coyotes, beavers, and black and grizzly bears occupy its drier territories containing common rabbit-brush and blue-bunch wheatgrass, which is red-listed under the Species-at-Risk Act (SARA). The skies of NWA can contain bald eagles, kingfishers and great blue herons along with trumpeter and tundra swans, which occupy its waters as well. One of the significant aspects of the NWA is that it plays a vital role in the Pacific Flyway, which is a migratory bird route coming from Alaska. Migratory birds that range from thousands to millions in numbers pass the NWA twice a year which serves as an important resting location before taking off to South America.

=== Species at risk ===
The NWA houses many species at risk. According to the NWA Management Plan, there are 10 species listed under SARA which is classified as either threatened, extirpated, of special concern or endangered. The NWA has six recorded species listed on Schedule 1: the American badger, little brown myotis, common nighthawk, Lewis's woodpecker, olive-sided flycatcher, and the northern leopard frog. Species of 'special concern' include the western population of the grizzly bear, peregrine falcon, western painted turtle, and the western toad. Surveys conducted in 2004 revealed two red-listed plant communities, black cottonwood and bluebunch wheatgrass, along with two blue-listed plant communities, swamp horsetail and common cattail. A noticeable decline in the vitality of cottonwood stands has been recorded in recent years, however, further work is needed to determine the cause of early decay and the change in long term mortality rates.

=== Invasive species ===
While invasive species are not a major concern for the NWA, some potentially-invasive plants such as Canada thistle are currently being monitored. This species could pose a threat to surrounding plant communities by secreting toxic chemicals from its roots and increasing erosion potential. Other invasive plants that might pose a threat in the future include the leafy spurge, purple loosestrife, and knapweed.

== Threats to natural habitats ==
A portion of the Wilmer Unit in the NWA was formerly used as a dump site and remediation was completed, following the Federal Contaminated Sites Action Plan. However, fences to combat recreational use need to be installed, along with further debris removal.

== Impacts of climate change and infrastructure development ==
The Columbia National Wildlife Area (NWA) has experienced an increase in human impacts with the expansion of residential areas such as the Edgewater and Bighorn Meadows Resort Community. Permitted activities outlined by the Canadian Wildlife Service include hiking, wildlife viewing, and canoeing. Any activity that damages or interferes with ecological processes is prohibited. Despite these restrictions, there has been an increase in motorized vehicle traffic (i.e. bikes and ATVs) along both authorized and unauthorized trails. These activities cause direct and indirect damage to ecological communities through trampling organisms and polluting the area with exhaust. Disruption to the river system by water skiers and other motorized vehicles is also becoming more common. Pollution in the form of fuel discharge and rapid movements that shift sediment and on occasion collide with fish have significant consequences for communities. Hunting illegally in the area has also been known to occur, due to the status of adjacent lands as being permissible hunting areas.

Industrial activities of logging, mining, gravel extraction, and agriculture have negatively impacted the Columbia National Wildlife Area. Resource extraction from surrounding areas may soon encroach on the protected areas, with prospectors already scouting and claiming land within the Nature Area. These activities are accompanied by the threat of logging roads, unsustainable harvesting, and general damage to vulnerable wetlands. Agricultural lands adjacent to the NWA create an issue of contaminated runoff water entering the fragile wetlands. The pesticides and herbicides used at these farms and contaminating the discharged water can cause serious harm to the plants and other organisms using the NWA. The transportation of these resources and others via the Canadian Pacific Railway has interfered with the NWA's ecological processes in the past as the rail runs adjacent to the NWA. Toxic materials such as hydrochloric acid, potash and coal have entered the protected area on multiple occasions when trains have derailed.

Currently, there is no record of significant impacts from climate change in the Columbia NWA; however, there are concerns about the future state of the protected area. Habitat shifting and subsequent shifts in species distributions are possible with changes in climate and water availability. Increased extreme weather events caused by climate change are likely; extreme floods or droughts will cause significant ecological damage. The NWA is also at risk of significant environmental damage as a result of wildfires, which have been increasing in intensity and frequency in the British Columbia interior for the past 13 years due to prolonged heat during the summer and drier forest conditions. This prolonged heat can also disrupt natural snowpack and melt patterns, affecting the coldwater creek systems existing in the NWA.

== Spatial management ==
The four unit areas, which are the Wilmer, Spillimacheen, Brisco, and Harrogate, defined within the Columbia National Wildlife Area are all managed by Canadian Wildlife Service. The areas within provide crucial habitats for a diverse range of wildlife, including many species at risk. The Columbia NWA is also a crucial part of the Pacific Flyway, which is a migratory route for many different species of waterfowl, connecting important wintering grounds in South America to nesting sites near the Arctic Ocean.

National Wildlife Areas are protected and administered in compliance with the Wildlife Area Regulations under the Canada Wildlife Act. The protection and conservation of wildlife and their habitat is the main goal of NWAs. All actions that can obstruct the conservation of wildlife may be restricted in an NWA for this reason and in accordance with the law. As a result, the majority of these protected areas are inaccessible to the general public and all activities are forbidden. However, if some activities are in line with the objectives of the NWA's management plan, they may be approved through public notification or the issuing of licences. The management plan's conservation objectives do not prohibit access to the Columbia NWA, and certain activities may be conducted there.

At access locations, public notices describing the permitted activities in the wildlife area are placed. Additional federal or provincial permits may be needed for a particular type of operation.

=== Habitat management ===
==== Wetlands ====
The wetlands are managed to prevent invasive species from spreading and to maintain the current hydrological regime and water quality. The Columbia Wetlands may not require direct management of the hydrological regime in the foreseeable future, but any potential interventions would be carried out in close coordination with NGOs and other organizations having an interest in or regulatory responsibility over the Columbia Wetlands. Every five years, the wetlands' water quality is checked to make sure it complies with Canadian Council of Ministers of the Environment standards.

Invasive plant species have not yet caused problems in NWA wetlands, but infestations in other parts of the East Kootenay highlight the necessity of ongoing monitoring and, if necessary, management action. Every five years, long-term trends in wetland distribution and composition are evaluated, and necessary action will be taken. An invasive plant management program might be created if invasive plants start to cause problems.

==== Riparian and cottonwood areas ====
The management plan places a high priority on maintaining the current riparian vegetation, which includes significant mature black cottonwood stands (especially near Spillimacheen).

Similar to the discussion on wetlands, maintaining the current hydrological regime is essential to conserving riparian habitats. Maps of the habitat and site visits are used to identify cottonwood-dominated areas that have had the greatest decrease or loss, which will help to prioritize and direct habitat restoration efforts. The causes of the decrease of riparian habitat will also be determined. If serious concerns are found, intervention to save cottonwood stands and riparian regions while preserving natural conditions may be required (e.g., beavers and possible forest or brush fires in the area).

Many sources have noted that the cottonwood stands near the levees in the marshes seem to be losing life. In certain areas of the marshes, there seem to be a lot of little, yet decaying trees.

According to preliminary research, there are issues with the condition of cottonwood stands in the wetlands. The oldest age class has the most restrictions. In remaining, extremely fragmented spots across the marshes, old, relic trees can be found, but huge, intact stands are uncommon.

==== Upland habitats ====
Upland habitats, including forested areas, will be preserved and restored as ecosystems that are characterized by recurrent low-intensity fires, especially at the Wilmer unit. Open parkland and a forest with a preponderance of mature trees will be preserved. This will be accomplished by evaluating a natural or ideal forest structure while taking into account the requirements of the various species. When necessary, stand management will be done.

To lower the risk of a catastrophic fire, stand closure and fuel loading targets will also be created based on provincial guidelines. With the proper discussion, planning, and safety precautions, prescribed burning will be taken into consideration.

These upland habitats have had the most disturbance and deterioration of any habitat type within the NWA. Controlling ATV access to sensitive upland areas has been attempted, but with mixed results. For the current trend to be reversed and habitat damage to be kept to a minimum, more effective access control mechanisms and more persistent monitoring of intrusions will be required. Site visits by enforcement staff will be enhanced to four times annually, and/or local government oversight of the NWA may get assistance. Invasive plant species are also more likely to spread due to the habitat damage caused by ATVs and other off-road vehicles.

=== Management challenges and threats ===
Many human activities and developments have threatened the natural state of the Columbia NWA, however while efforts are pushing to mitigate this, the issue still stands. The Rocky Mountain Trench has been the site of rapid residential, agricultural and recreational development in communities such as Invermere, which has posed threats to the surrounding land base. This has led to an encroaching issue of ATVs, dirtbikes, and other off-road vehicles posing a threat to sensitive grasslands, parklands, and habitat areas, specifically upland areas within the Wilmer unit. Seasonal activities like hiking, canoeing, and animal viewing are allowed as long as they don't have a negative influence on the area's conservation values.

== See also ==
- List of National Wildlife Areas in Canada
