= Isle Haute =

Island in Nova Scotia, Canada

Coordinates: 45°15′5.92″N 65°0′20.41″W

Native name: Maskusetik
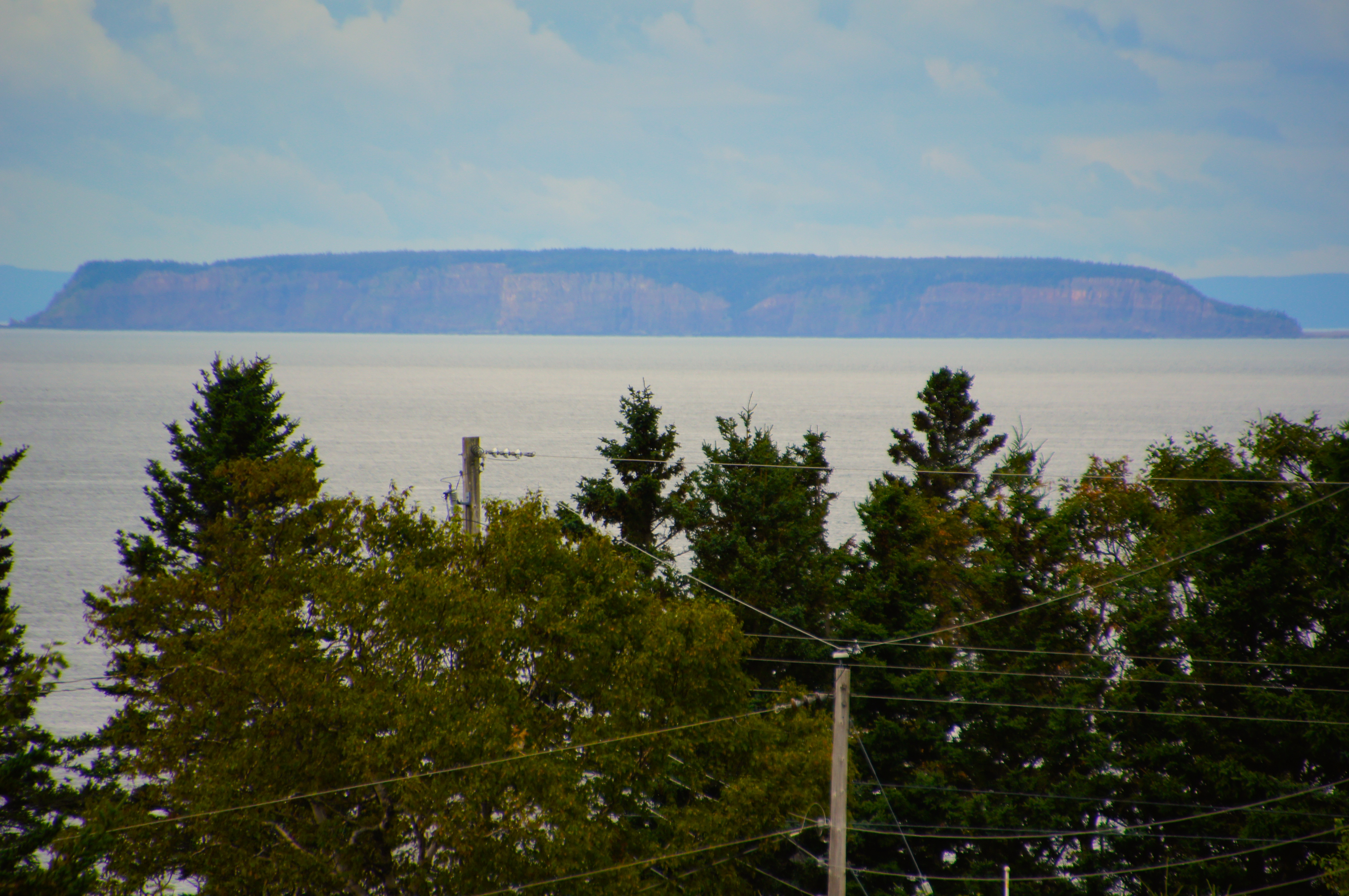
- Image taken at low tide at Harbourville, Nova Scotia

- Isle Haute
- Etymology: "High Island" (Samuel de Champlain, 1604)

Geography
- Location: Bay of Fundy
- Area: 83 ha (210 acres)
- Length: 3 km (1.9 mi)
- Width: 400 m (1300 ft)
- Highest elevation: 100 m (300 ft)

Administration
- Canada

Demographics
- Population: 0

Additional information
- Time zone: AST
- A Fundy Island's Story", Gulf of Maine Times Autumn 2002

Isle Haute is an island in the upper regions of Bay of Fundy in Cumberland County, Nova Scotia, near the entrance to the Minas Basin. It is 16 kilometers from Harbourville and eight kilometers south-southwest of Cape Chignecto. The island is three kilometres (1.9 mi) long and 400 metres (1,300 ft) wide.

== History ==
The steep 100 m (328 ft) basalt cliffs of the island are the result from volcanic eruptions in the Jurassic period and may have been connected to the North Mountain volcanic ridge on the mainland 200 million years ago, before the Bay of Fundy was formed.

The Mi'kmaq used the island to make stone tools before Europeans arrived and called the island "Maskusetik", meaning place of wild beans, hidden oats. In 1604, Samuel de Champlain gave the present name to the island, which means "High Island" in French, when he observed the towering bluffs, timber and fresh-water springs.

In 1878, a lighthouse was built and was staffed until 1956, when fire collapsed the lighthouse and home of the lighthouse keeper. The lighthouse was replaced by a steel tower and is unstaffed. Federally owned, the island was transferred from the Canadian Coast Guard to the Canadian Wildlife Service to protect its unique ecosystem, and became a National Wildlife Area in 2025. The island is also protected under Nova Scotia's Special Places Act to protect early Mi'kmaq archaeological sites.

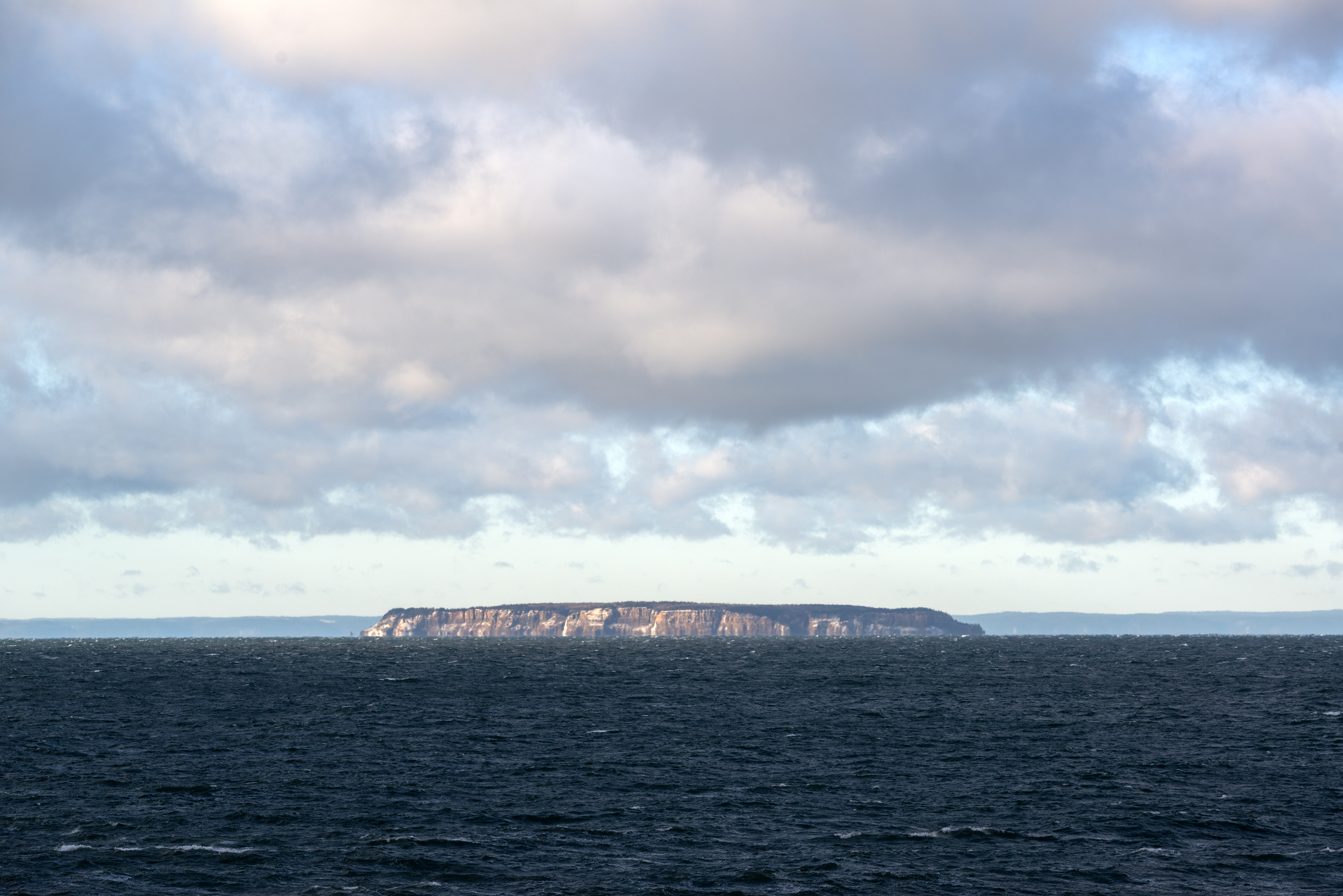
General view of Isle Haute from Morden, Nova Scotia, Canada. The island's basalt cliffs rise above the Bay of Fundy.

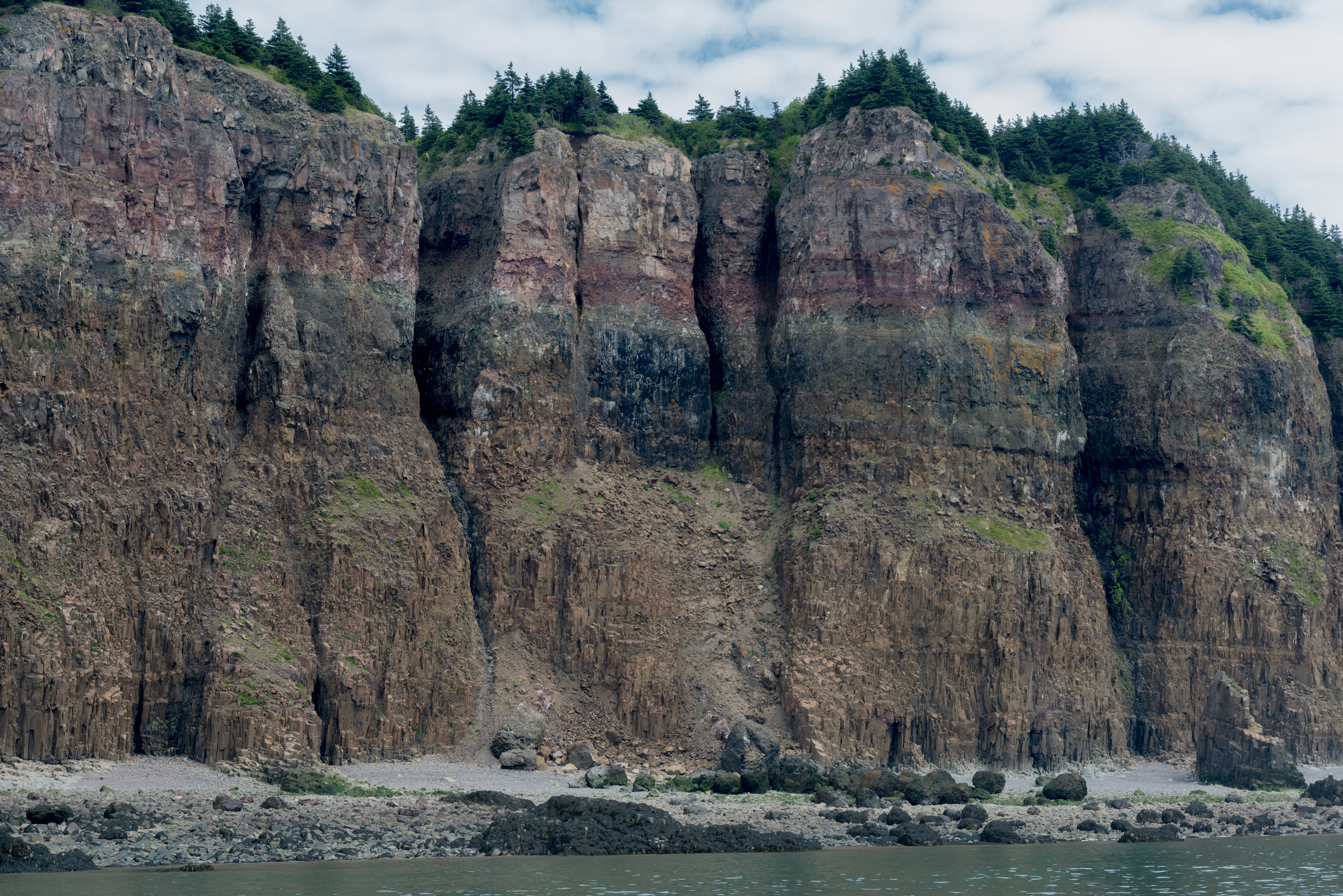
Basalt cliffs along the southern coast of Isle Haute in the Bay of Fundy, Nova Scotia. Columnar basalt and successive volcanic flows are visible in the cliff face.

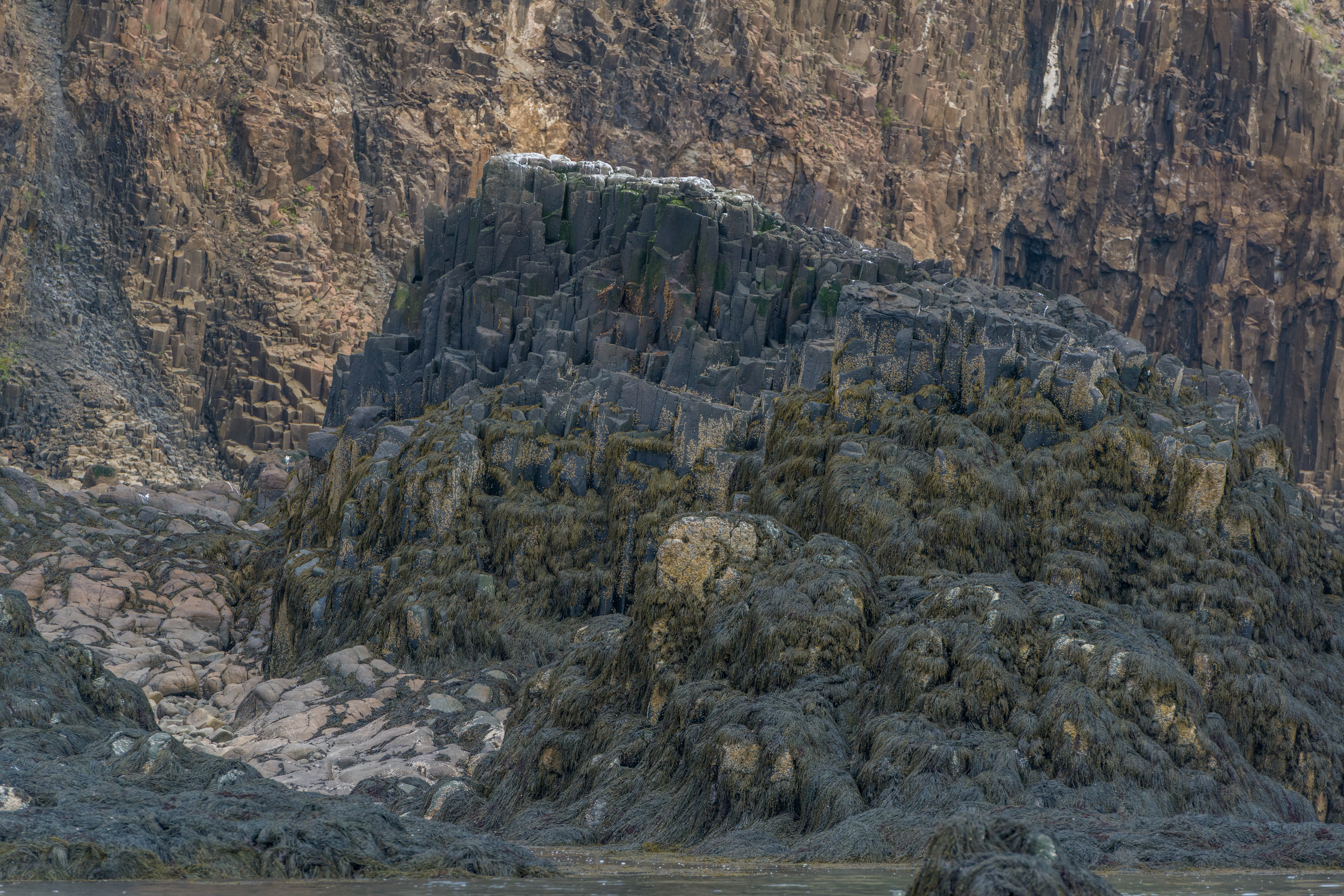
Columnar basalt exposed on the coast of Isle Haute in the Bay of Fundy, Nova Scotia. The polygonal columns formed as basalt contracted while cooling after volcanic activity.

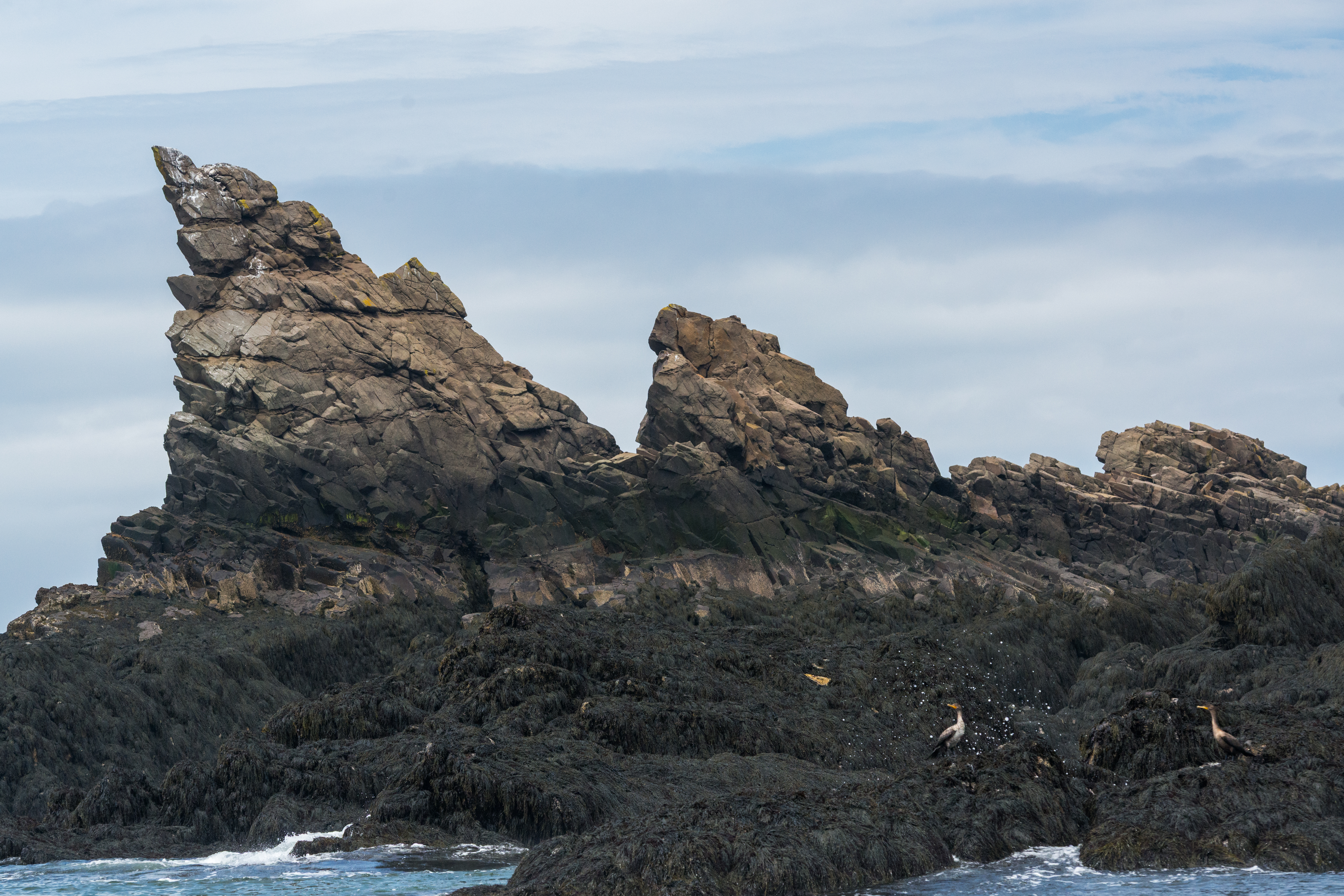
The Shark Fins rock formation on the western coast of Isle Haute in the Bay of Fundy, Nova Scotia, Canada. The surrounding intertidal reefs provide habitat and foraging grounds for seabirds, including cormorants.

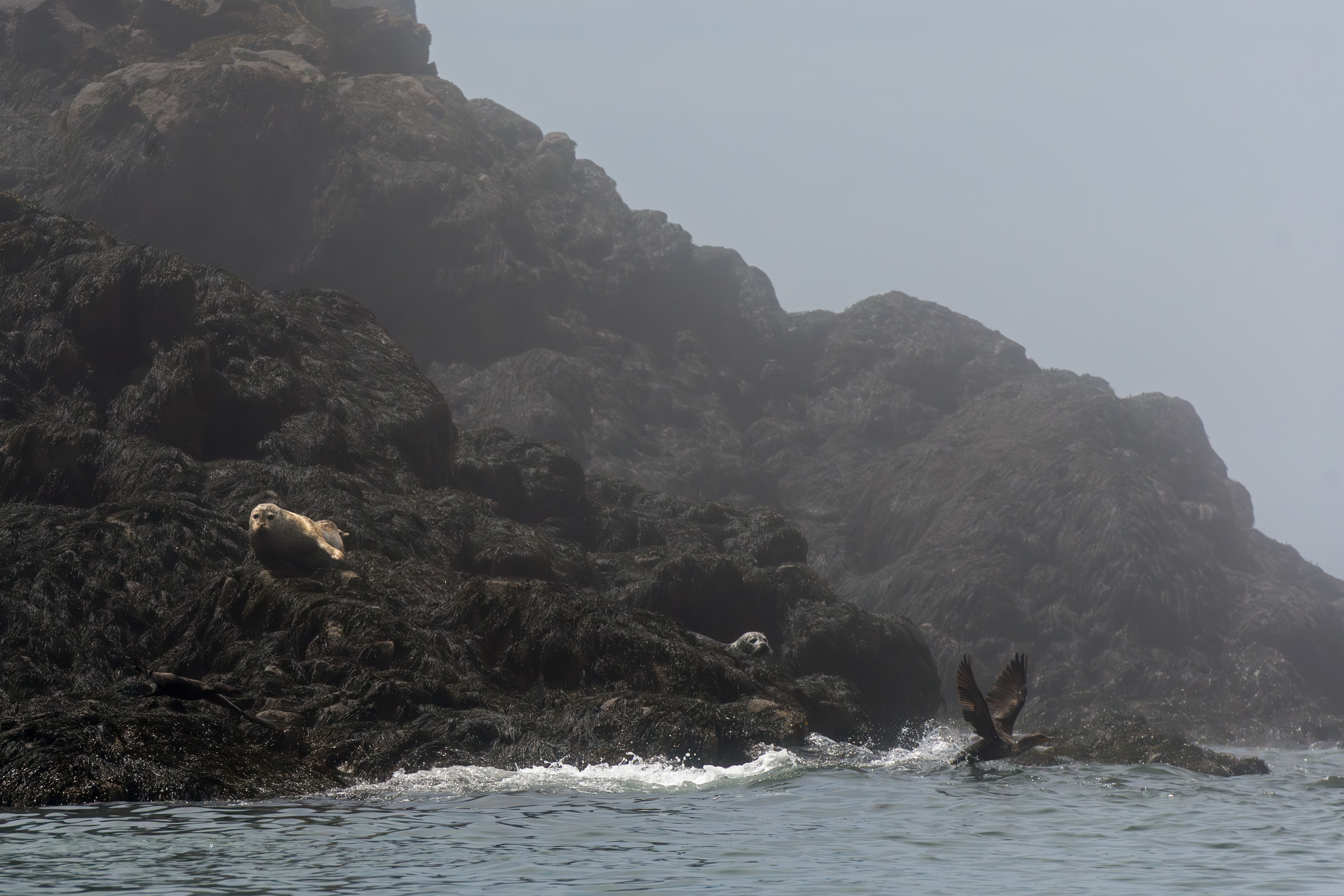
Grey seals resting on the rocky shoreline of Isle Haute in the Bay of Fundy, Nova Scotia. A cormorant takes flight in the foreground.

== See also ==
- Basalt Headlands
- Volcanology of Canada
- Volcanology of Eastern Canada
