= Widgeon Valley National Wildlife Area =

Protected natural area in British Columbia, Canada

- IUCN category Ia (strict nature reserve)
- Location within British Columbia Location within Greater Vancouver Regional District
- Location: Metro Vancouver, British Columbia, Canada
- Nearest city: Pitt Meadows
- Coordinates: 49°22′10″N 122°38′00″W
- Area: 125 ha (310 acres)
- Designation: National Wildlife Area
- Established: October 1973
- Governing body: Canadian Wildlife Service
- Website: www.canada.ca/en/environment-climate-change/services/national-wildlife-areas/locations/widgeon-valley.html

Widgeon Valley National Wildlife Area is a National Wildlife Area located near the south end of Pitt Lake in British Columbia, Canada. The property was purchased by the Nature Trust of British Columbia in 1973 and declared a National Wildlife Area by the Canadian Wildlife Service in October of that year. The Widgeon Valley National Wildlife Area is a biologically diverse marsh wetland. It is the traditional territory of various First Nations groups. The Widgeon Valley Wildlife Area is a protected wildlife area that is home to a number of sensitive waterfowl and fish species. The public uses the channels through the Widgeon Valley National Wildlife Area for recreational canoeing, anywhere else within the protected area is strictly off-limits to the public. There are future plans to develop interpretive trails through the park and open it to the public.

== Ecology ==
Despite its small size, Widgeon Valley NWA hosts a variety of habitat types. The central lowlands are dominated by a dense stand of hardhack interspersed with grasses, forbs, and skunk cabbage. The uplands along the western end of the NWA feature a mixed deciduous-conifer woodland. The wetlands of Widgeon Valley feature lodgepole pine interspersed within a diverse collection of shrubby vegetation, most notably Labrador tea and horsetail.

The wetlands of Widgeon Valley provide critical habitat for migratory waterfowl and other wetland-dependent wildlife. Its close proximity to Pitt Polder and other wetland areas contribute to the biodiversity and ecological resilience of the Pitt Lake region.

=== History ===
Given that one of the main activities of the Katzie First Nation was harvesting waterfowl, anadromous and freshwater fish, these may have been common species within Widgeon Creek, it is also possible that shellfish could have been a common species within the surrounding waterbodies given the evidence of shell middens that can be found in the Pitt Lake. Popular vegetation and plant species would have been cranberries, wapato, and berries as these were commonly cultivated by the Katzie. The red cedar and hemlock trees were quite vast and popular as they were often harvested and used by the Katzie for hunting, trading, and gathering purposes.

=== Wetland status ===
The marsh wetland ecosystem in Widgeon Valley National Wildlife Area is one of few remaining wetland ecosystems in British Columbia. Estimates of British Columbia's wetland ecosystem land area vary from 5.6% (5.28 million hectares) to 7%. An approximate 85% of British Columbia’s freshwater wetland ecosystems have been either disturbed or destroyed completely. Threats to wetland ecosystems include invasive species; land development activities, such as mining and oil and gas extraction; forest management practices, and recreational activities. The majority of British Columbia’s wetland ecosystems are located in and around the developed Lower Mainland.

Adjacent wetlands to Widgeon Valley National Wildlife Area include the Pitt Polder Ecological Reserve, a fen wetland, and the Pitt Addington Wildlife Management Area, a swamp wetland.

=== Wildlife ===
The Widgeon Valley’s proximity to the Pacific Flyway has made it a local hotspot for avian wildlife. Red-tailed hawk, and western screech owls (Kennicotti) fill the valley’s avian predator niche. Aquatic migratory birds such as the Canada goose, and several varieties of duck; mallard, wood, and cinnamon teal occupy the valley's water system. Northern pintails, greater scaups, common goldeneyes, bufflehead, dunlins, horned grebes, and western grebes also make the Widgeon Valley their winter refuge. The aquatic ecosystem supports fish such as steelhead, cutthroat trout, and a unique population of sockeye salmon that have adapted to the water system's tidal conditions. Amphibians such as northwestern salamanders, rough skinned newts and red legged frogs can be found in the Widgeon Valley's large marsh. Larger fauna include beaver, river otter, with cougars, bobcats, black bears, and deer also frequenting the area.

==== Western screech owl ====
The western screech owl’s (Kennicotti) risk status was raised from "special concern" to "threatened" in 2017 by Canada’s Species at Risk Registry (SARA). The total population is estimated to be 10000 individuals across the coast of British Columbia. The most recent estimates show a population decline of at least 30% from the early 2000s to 2014. In some regions such as Metro Vancouver, where human activities and habitat destruction is of a high degree, the western screech owl has been extirpated. The Western Screech owl is being outcompeted and preyed upon by the invasive barred owl. The Widgeon Valley is an essential region to the western screech owl as its main competitor, the barred owl, has yet to establish a population in the valley. Climate change poses a significant threat to the western screech owl through habitat destruction and resource depletion. Extreme summers cause heat waves resulting in decreased biodiversity and increased resource scarcity. Increased frequency of extreme weather such as storms and floods fell trees used as shelter by the Western Screech owl.

==== Vegetation ====
Much of the Widgeon Valley is dominated by wetland vegetation as the largest ecosystem of the protected area is marsh. The marsh supports a sweet gale shrub community with much of the area being densely populated by shrubbery. Indigenous groups have traditionally harvested many of the edible plants in the marsh such as wapato, wild rice, bog blueberries, bog cranberries, and water plantain. Widgeon Valley's forests also supports many edible plants such as salmon berry, black caps, coastal strawberry, trailing blackberry, salal berry, thimbleberry, saskatoon berry, and huckleberry. Widgeon Valley is located within the Coastal Western Hemlock dry maritime biogeoclimatic zone with approximately 66% its forests being dominated by two distinct ecosystems: the hemlock and flat moss ecosystem, and the red cedar and sword fern ecosystem. The widgeon valley hosts trees such as douglas fir, sitka spuce, red abig-leaf, and big leaf maple. The age of the trees vary based on location and species due to logging. Hemlock and red cedar make up the older population being considered second growth while big leaf maple trees in the area are significantly younger.

=== Invasive species ===
Several non-native plant species have been observed in Widgeon Valley National Wildlife Area, some of which are considered invasive species. Many of these invasive species have been introduced from local residential areas. A list of observed invasive species in Widgeon Valley National Wildlife Area can be found below.

Invasive Plant Species in Widgeon Valley National Wildlife Area
Bog Loosestrife
Butterfly bush
Bulbous rush
Canada thistle
Common foxglove
Common St. John’s-wort
English holly
English ivy
European mountain-ash
Evergreen blackberry
Hairy cat’s-ear
Hedge bindweed
Himalayan blackberry
Japanese knotweed
Orange hawkweed
Purple loosestrife
Reed canarygrass
Scotch broom
Small touch-me-not
Southern wild rice (Zizania aquatica var. aquatic)
Sticky ragwort
Yellow archangel
Yellow flag iris

== Human activity ==
=== Aboriginal history ===
For thousands of years prior to Widgeon Valley becoming protected, the Katzie First Nations occupied the area. The Katzie people used the Widgeon Valley Wildlife Area to fish for freshwater fish, to hunt small animals and waterfowl, to gather cedar bark, and even used the slough banks to cultivate wild cranberries and wapato. Widgeon Valley was used for ceremonial purposes by the Katzie First Nation, Kwikwetlem First Nation, Stó:l– o First Nation, Tsawwassen First Nation, Soowahlie First Nation, Shxw’ow’hamel First Nation, Skawahlook First Nation, and The Seabird Island Band. Ethnographers have discovered at least one ancient Katzie village within the wildlife area.

=== Ownership ===
In 1940, two logging companies sold the land that would become The Widgeon Valley National Wildlife Area to the Burnett family. The Burnett family later sold the land to The Nature Trust of British Columbia in 1973, who later that year leased the land for 99 years to Environment and Climate Change Canada for conservation purposes. These areas are established to protect sensitive species and species at risk. The Widgeon Valley National Wildlife Area would become part of a larger complex of wildlife areas set within the largest natural freshwater marsh in Southwestern British Columbia.

=== Recreational use ===
The channels through the Widgeon Valley National Wildlife Area are open to the public. Canoes and other non-motorized floatation devices are permitted in the channels, and many people use the channels to reach Widgeon Creek campsite in Pinecone Burke Provincial Park. A nearby canoe rental business rents out rents-out up to 60 canoes a day. The most recreational use of the Widgeon Valley channels happens mid-fall through to early spring as the waterfowl population within the channels is at its highest. Many people exit their canoes explore and to picnic in the wildlife area, which becomes potentially harmful to the protected area. Most of the conservation efforts within the Widgeon Valley National Wildlife Area go towards putting up signs along the channels banks to deter people from entering the protected wildlife areas.

=== Future plans ===
Plans approved in 2019 by the Metro Vancouver Regional District include opening the Widgeon Valley National Wildlife Area to the public. The future plans involve the development of numerous trails, day-use areas, facilities, interpretive signage, a canoe launch, and canoe tie-offs along the channel. These developments will cover roughly 6% of the Widgeon Valley National Wildlife Area. Consultation and planning will be done with the Katzie First Nation as well as numerous other local First Nations that have historically used the area. Interpretive signage along the trails through the Widgeon Valley National Wildlife Area will provide information to the public about the natural and cultural history t With the exception of hunting, First Nations will once again be able to use the land traditionally.

== Geography ==
The protected area is located in a broad, flat-bottomed valley immediately west of the south end of Pitt Lake. The valley is dominated by Widgeon Creek, which meanders throughout the valley to form a vast wetland before draining into Widgeon Slough.

=== Geomorphology ===
Major glacial movement and processes have been key components of Widgeon Valley's current landscape. The landscape's formation can be attributed to a major glacial advance in which ice covered the land over 10,000 years ago, retreated, and left numerous fiords and elongated lakes in interior valleys and the valley’s typical U-shape. The rapid expansion of the Fraser River delta is believed to be the major cause of the formation of both Widgeon valley and Pitt Lake about 7,000 to 8,000 years ago when these two were believed to be former fiords before being sealed off by this fluvial process.

=== Terrestrial and aquatic habitats ===
While Widgeon Valley comprises both wetland and terrestrial habitats, it is dominated by wetlands. Riverine and slough processes are the most significant traits of Widgeon Valley wetlands, these processes and occurrences are synonymous with the Widgeon Creek channels. The existence of high elevated banks of riverine and tidal sloughs supports riparian shrub species and some trees. The high occurrence of tidal sloughs has created so many channels and allowed the scattering of open ponds throughout the interior with its connection to the river. The Ponds are also surrounded by herbaceous wetland habitats which are flooded seasonally.

Extending from riparian streams, and slough banks down to herbaceous wetlands are the Hardhack shrub regions which are the biggest habitat type that includes large areas of mixed communities and species of herbaceous plants and encroaching shrubs. Despite comprising mainly wetland habitats, the valley has terrestrial habitats that are made up of old-growth and second-growth forests.

== See also ==
- List of National Wildlife Areas in Canada
