= Mohawk Island =

Island in Ontario, Canada

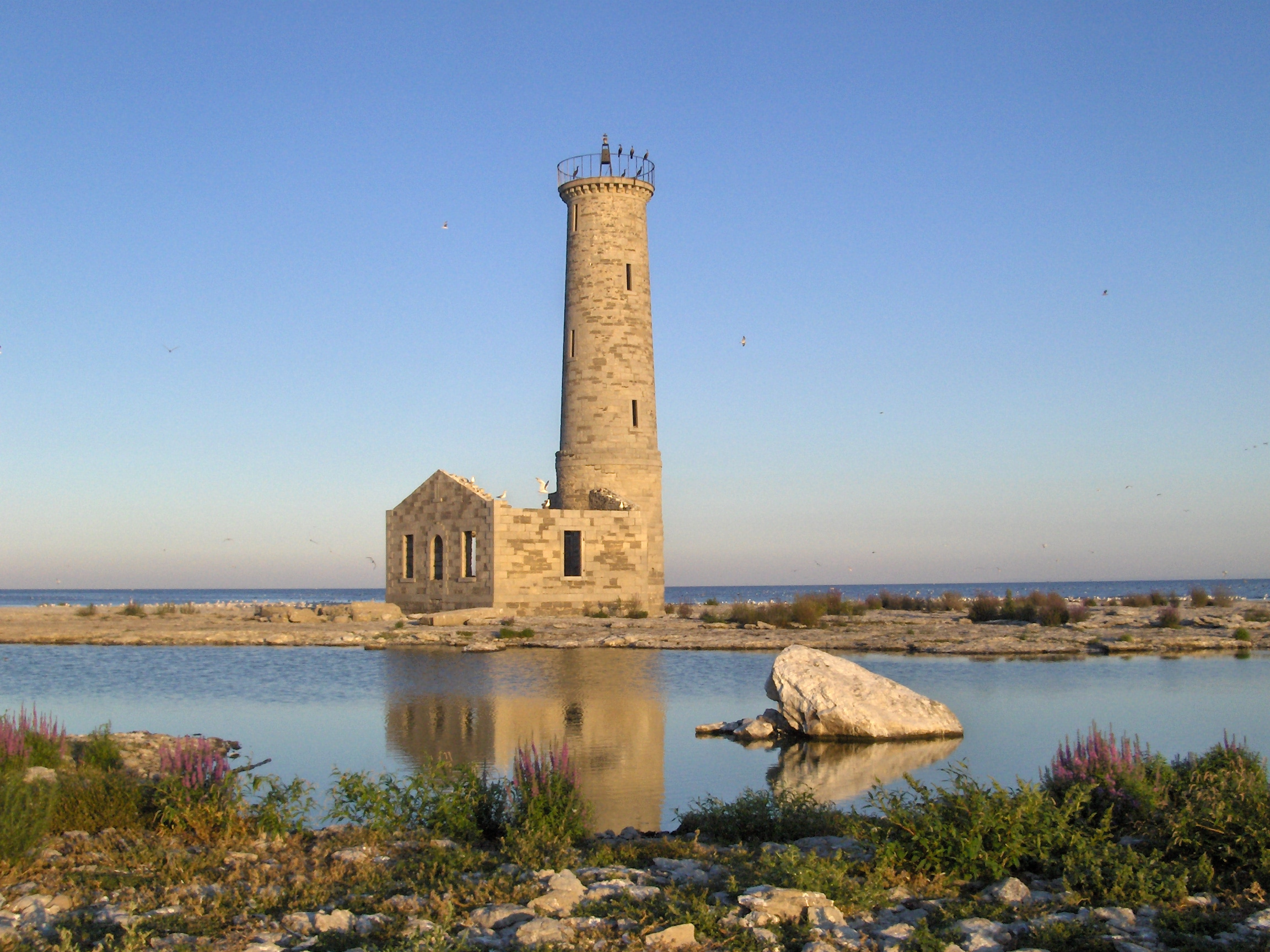
- Gull Island Lighthouse

- Location within Southern Ontario

Geography
- Location: Lake Erie
- Coordinates: 42°50′2″N 79°31′21″W
- Area: 0.04 km^{2} (0.015 sq mi)

Administration
- Canada
- Province: Ontario
- County: Haldimand County

Demographics
- Population: Uninhabited

Additional information
- IUCN category Ia (strict nature reserve)
- Location: Golden Horseshoe
- Area: 4 ha (9.9 acres)
- Created: 1978
- Governing body: Canadian Wildlife Service
- Website: www.canada.ca/en/environment-climate-change/services/national-wildlife-areas/locations/mohawk-island.html

Mohawk Island is a small (4 hectares (9.9 acres)) island in the northeast of Lake Erie, in Haldimand County, Ontario, Canada. It is composed of limestone with almost no vegetation, and is close to the water level. It was formerly known as Gull Island and contains the ruins of the Gull Island Lighthouse which was built in 1848 to guide ships into the Welland Canal at Port Maitland. In 1933, the lighthouse was automated to no longer require a human keeper and lost significance in 1934 due to the realignment of the canal at Port Colborne. It was decommissioned in 1969 when the mechanism was destroyed by a fire. The lighthouse is located close to the shore of Rock Point Provincial Park.

Currently, no humans live on the island, and it is mostly inhabited by birds. It is an important nesting and loafing area for gulls, terns and cormorants. The island is also used by migratory birds such as Canada geese as a stopover point. Management of the island was transferred to the Canadian Wildlife Service in 1976 and it was designated as the Mohawk Island National Wildlife Area in 1978. The lighthouse ruin was protected as a heritage lighthouse in 2015.

== Geography ==
Mohawk Island is located in the eastern basin of Lake Erie in Ontario, 20 kilometres (12 mi) southeast of Port Maitland, near the mouth of the Grand River. The island is a limestone outcrop barely above Lake Erie. The island's bedrock is composed of Dundee Limestone, an Eifelian geological formation (397.5 to 391.8 million years old). Because of its low elevation, the proportion of the island's land area varies with lake level. For example, the area of the island was 16,325 square metres (175,720 sq ft) in 1995 and 26,325 square metres (283,360 sq ft) in 2006. The level of Lake Erie can vary by as much as 4 metres (13 ft), but generally fluctuates between 1 and 2 metres (3 ft 3 in and 6 ft 7 in). During November storms waves on the lake can reach 2 to 5 metres (6 ft 7 in to 16 ft 5 in) completely submerging the island.

The island's climate is tempered by the Great Lakes. In the spring, the temperature is cooled by moist air masses from Lake Erie and remains near the freezing point. In the fall and winter, the warmer lake water warms the air and often forms fog.

The island is bare to the rock, although some crevices and the highest area of the island have a thin layer of soil. It has a beach and a sand and gravel mound on its south and east coasts. On the southeast side, there is a mound of zebra and quagga mussel shells.

== Natural environment ==
=== Flora ===
The vegetation on Mohawk Island is sparse and not very diverse. There are only a few herbaceous and grassy colonies in the crevices of the island. Species present include common cinquefoil, lady's thumb, dandelion, an unidentified dock species, purple loosestrife and goldenrod species. Lichens and mosses are also found on the rock. Sedges and rushes grow in the submerged crevices. As the island is bare to bedrock and exposed to frequent heavy rainfall it is unlikely that vegetation will recover.

=== Fauna ===
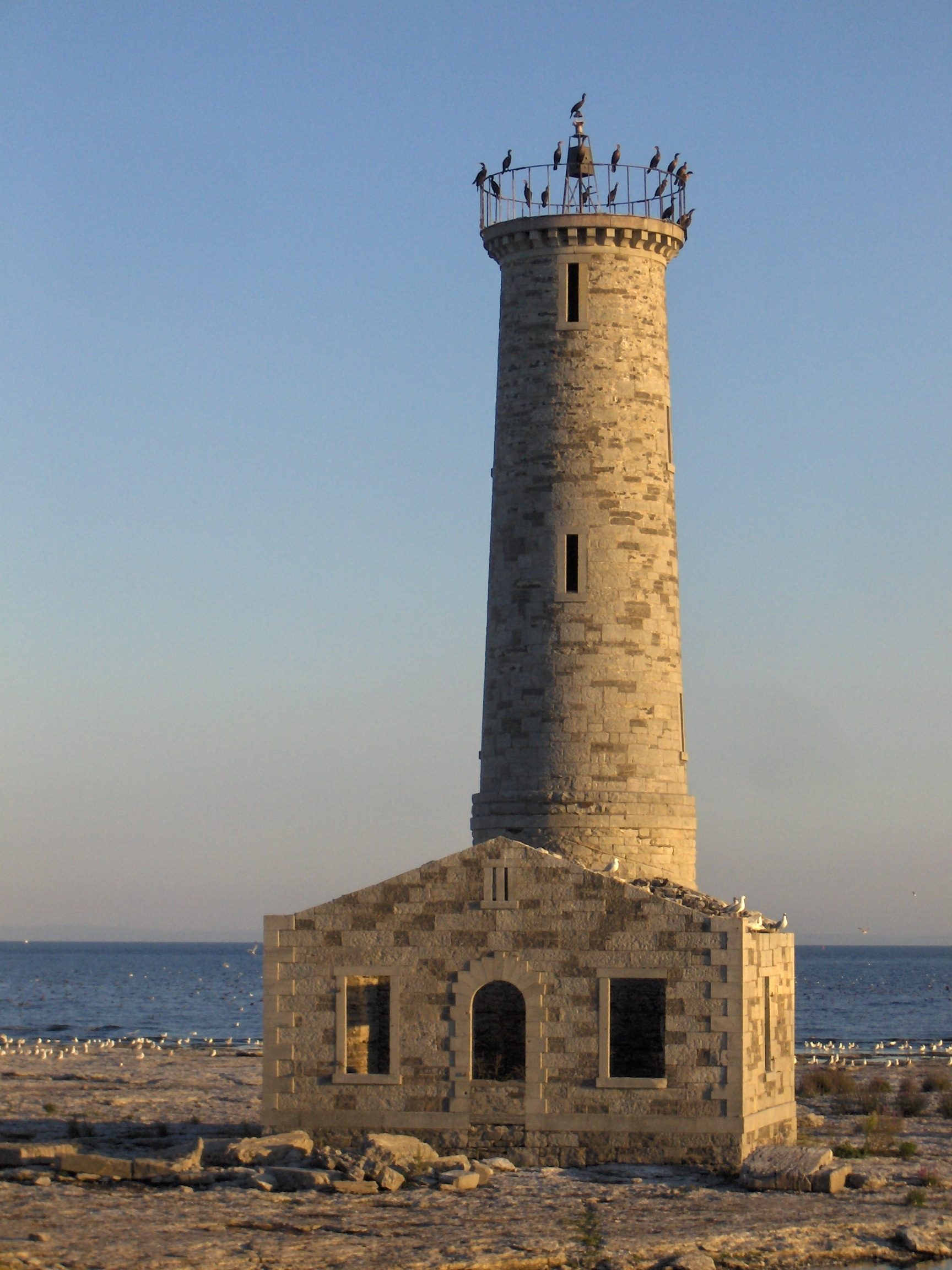
The Gull Island lighthouse where cormorants and gulls roost.

The main breeding bird species are the herring gull, ring-billed gull, double-crested cormorant and Caspian tern. The Herring Gull and Double-crested Cormorant colonies on the island are the largest recorded in the eastern basin of Lake Erie. The Caspian Tern colony is the only known colony in the lake. Common Tern and Great Black-backed Gull have also nested on the island.

The first record of nesting Herring Gulls was in 1943. The population then slowly increased to 200 nests by 1966. The population then began to vary from year to year between 200 and 250 nests. The 253 nests in 2007 represented 10.1% of the nests recorded around Lake Erie. Ring-billed Gulls were also first reported on the island in 1943. The population there increased much more rapidly than the Hudson's Gull, reaching a peak of 6,300 nests in 1964. The population then varied between 1,500 and 2,400 nests. The 2201 nests recorded in 2010 represented 6.1% of the nests around Lake Erie.

Double-crested cormorants arrived on the island in 1983. The number of nests has steadily increased since then, reaching a peak of 1,586 nests in 2008. This increase is representative of the increase observed around the Great Lakes. In 2009, the 800 nests represent 9% of the number of nests around Lake Erie.

Caspian terns began nesting on the island in 1996. They nest exclusively on deposits of zebra and quagga mussel shells, both of which are invasive species in the Great Lakes. Although variable, the breeding population is steadily increasing. In 2007, the colony consisted of 300 nests, or 10.3% of the Great Lakes population. In 1946, the common tern was the main species nesting on the island with between 1,400 and 1,800 pairs. Beginning in 1960, the gull population increased, resulting in a decrease in vegetation on the island as well as a decrease in pairs. No more nests have been observed since 2004. The Great Black-backed Gull, first observed on the island in 1991, nests on the island intermittently.

The low level of the island makes the colonies particularly vulnerable to waves. For example, the Caspian tern colony was completely destroyed in June 2010 by a large seiche that raised the water level by more than a meter in the eastern basin of Lake Erie.

Since 1970, at least twenty species of waterfowl have been observed within 1.5 kilometres (0.93 mi) of the island's shoreline. During migration periods, mallards, Canada geese, goldeneyes, scaups and sandpipers frequent the Mohawk Island area as they cross Lake Erie. The population of mallards and American black ducks using the area more than doubled between the 1970s and 1990s and the Canada goose population increased more than thirteen-fold. The island area is considered of secondary importance compared to other areas of Lake Erie, such as Long Point National Wildlife Area.

Other than birds, only one vertebrate species has been observed on the island, the garter snake, seen in the lighthouse foundation.

== History ==
The lighthouse and lightkeeper's house, originally known as Gull Island, were built between 1846 and 1848 to mark the shoals near the entrance to the Welland Canal at Port Maitland. Standing 18 metres (59 ft) high, the lighthouse has an octagonal iron lantern topped by a dome. Its light beam had a range of 18 kilometres (11 mi). In 1911, the Ontario Department of Lands, Forests and Mines recommended that ownership of the lighthouse island be transferred to the federal Department of Marine and Fisheries to facilitate maintenance. The lighthouse was automated in 1933. In 1934, the entrance to the Welland Canal was transferred to Port Colborne, reducing the importance of the lighthouse. In 1969, a fire destroyed the mechanisms. It was replaced the same year by a simple navigation buoy.

In 1970, the Canadian Wildlife Service recommended the transfer of the island and its designation as a National Wildlife Area to protect its bird colonies. Ownership of the island was transferred in 1976 and it was designated a National Wildlife Area in 1978. In 1977, Transport Canada issued a demolition notice because it considered the old lighthouse to be a public hazard, though eventually abandoned the idea following public pressure. Only the walls of the lighthouse and the house remain in 2016 and it is forbidden to enter the interior of the structure. It was classified as a heritage lighthouse in 2015 by the Historic Sites and Monuments Board of Canada.

== Land protection ==
The island is located entirely within the Mohawk Island National Wildlife Area, a national wildlife area administered by the Canadian Wildlife Service of Environment and Climate Change Canada. It is one of the few protected areas in the vicinity, along with Byng Island Conservation Area, James N. Allan Provincial Park, and Rock Point Provincial Park which is a banding station for the Canadian Migration Monitoring Network. Access to Mohawk Island is prohibited except by permit between April 1 and August 30 to avoid disturbance of breeding birds. From September 1 to March 31, access is permitted during daylight hours, including by motorboat. Permitted activities include "wildlife viewing, picnicking, recreational fishing from shore ... [and] swimming". Entering the stone lighthouse structures is not permitted.

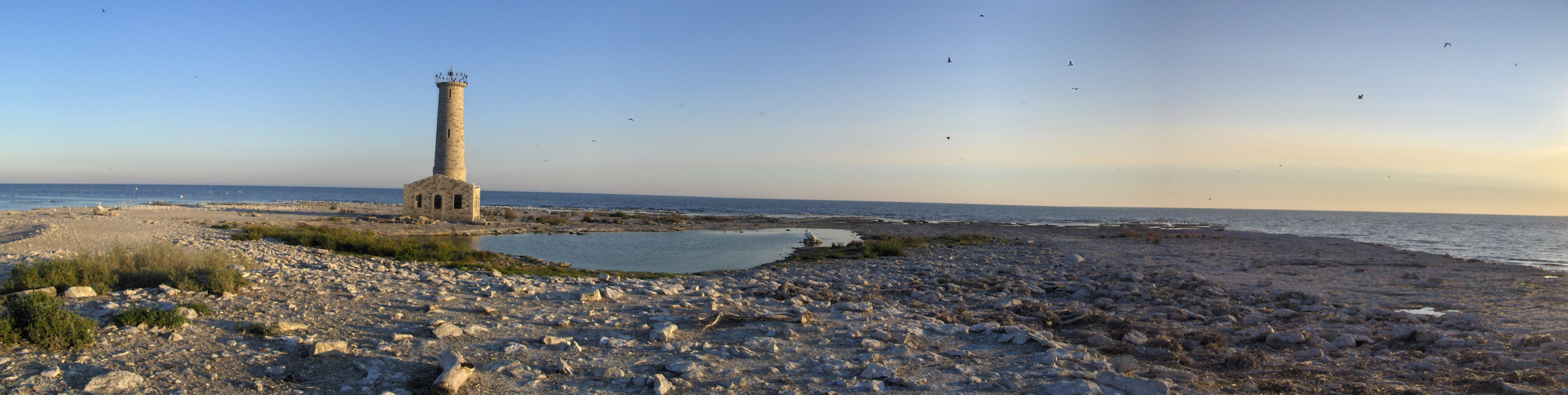
Panoramic view of the island.
