= Eleanor Island (Canada) =

Island in Lake Muskoka, Ontario, Canada

- Location within Southern Ontario

Geography
- Coordinates: 44°59′00″N 79°23′26″W
- Adjacent to: Lake Muskoka
- Area: 0.81 ha (2.0 acres)

Administration
- Canada
- Province: Ontario
- District: Muskoka
- Municipality: Gravenhurst

Additional information
- IUCN category Ia (strict nature reserve)
- Designation: Migratory Bird Sanctuary; National Wildlife Area
- Established: 1971, 1978
- Administrator: Canadian Wildlife Service

Eleanor Island is an island in Lake Muskoka, Ontario, Canada. It is an important nesting and migration site for waterbird colonies, and is designated as both a National Wildlife Area and a Migratory Bird Sanctuary.

As a strict wildlife habitat, public access to the island is prohibited. It is owned and administered by the Canadian Wildlife Service of the Department of Environment and Climate Change Canada.

Prior to 1970, Eleanor Island was owned by the Township of Muskoka. Due to the pending restructuring of Muskoka District, the township transferred ownership of the island to the Canadian Wildlife Service on September 1, 1970. The island was declared a Migratory Bird Sanctuary in 1971, and in order to provide a stronger protection status, it was made a National Wildlife Area in 1978.

== Geography ==
The small island is located in the southern basin of Lake Muskoka, and is one of few remaining undeveloped islands in the lake. It consists of a rocky granite shore with mature mixed coniferous trees in the interior. The island, part of the Canadian Shield, is sloped downwards to the east with its highest point on the west side, where a steep rockface dives into the water.

The vegetation consists of red oak, eastern white cedar, and eastern white pine, along with grasses and shrubs such as elderberry and raspberry.

== Fauna ==
Since Eleanor Island is on the path of the Atlantic Flyway, many bird species pass through the area during spring and fall migration. The island's isolation protects young nestlings from predators, while providing easy access to food in surrounding waters.

The main bird species on the island are great blue heron (Ardea herodias), herring gull (Larus argentatus), and double-crested cormorant (Phalacrocorax auritus), which have colonies of several hundred nests. Historically, ring-billed gulls also nested on the island, but appear no longer to do so since 2009.

Other bird species spotted on Eleanor Island include red-winged blackbird (Agelaius phoeniceus), purple martin (Progne subis), dunlin (Calidris alpina), horned lark (Eremophila alpestris), Canada goose (Branta canadensis), black-bellied plover (Pluvialis squatarola), ruddy turnstone (Arenaria interpres), Bonaparte's gull (Chroicocephalus philadelphia), common raven (Corvus corax), least sandpiper (Calidris minutilla), American crow (Corvus brachyrhynchos), tree swallow (Tachycineta bicolor), gadwall (Mareca strepera), ring-billed gull (Larus delawarensis), black-crowned night heron (Nycticorax nycticorax), white-crowned sparrow (Zonotrichia leucophrys), and song sparrow (Melospiza melodia).

No species at risk or invasive species are found on the island.
