= Canada Wildlife Act =

Statute of the Government of Canada

Parliament of Canada
- Long title: An Act respecting wildlife in Canada
- Citation: R.S.C., 1985, c. W-9
- Enacted: 1985
- Royal assent: 1973
- Status: Current legislation

The Canada Wildlife Act (French: Loi sur les espèces sauvages du Canada) is a statute of the Government of Canada. It specifies the requirements for a geographic area in Canada to be designated a National Wildlife Area by the Canadian Wildlife Service division of Environment Canada. The intent of the law is to provide protection to wildlife and their corresponding habitats, both on land and in sea.

== Description ==
"The purpose of wildlife areas is to preserve habitats that are critical to migratory birds and other wildlife species, particularly those that are at risk." Further, the Wildlife Area Regulations, a component of the Canada Wildlife Act, identifies activities which are prohibited on such areas because they may harm a protected species or its habitat. In some circumstances, land use permits may be granted to individuals, organizations, or companies if the intended use is compatible with conservation of the area. Personal activities such as "hiking, canoeing, photography and bird watching can be carried out without a permit in most areas".

The Act received Royal Assent in 1973. Areas subject to the Act may be designated National Wildlife Areas. These ensure that vital habitat for bird and wildlife species, especially those that are endangered or threatened, is preserved. Before the 1960s, the primary threat to such species was physical disturbance and hunting. By the 1970s the major threat was habitat destruction and alteration.

== See also ==
- R. v. Badger
