= Sand Pond National Wildlife Area =

Protected area in Nova Scotia

Coordinates: 43°48′30″N 65°50′0″W

- IUCN category IV (habitat/species management area)
- Interactive map of Sand Pond National Wildlife Area
- Location: Nova Scotia
- Nearest city: Argyle
- Area: 531 hectares (1,310 acres)
- Established: 1978
- Governing body: Environment Canada

The Sand Pond National Wildlife Area is a 531 hectares (1,310 acres) National Wildlife Area located in Yarmouth County, Nova Scotia, Canada, adjacent to Argyle. The wildlife area was established in 1978, and is protected and managed in accordance with the Wildlife Area Regulations. It is administered by Environment Canada.

Upland habitats, including forests, heath communities, and oldfields, provide important breeding and migratory habitat for birds. The soil consists mainly of thin layers of sand and gravel, locally overlain by peat. Poor drainage has resulted in the development of two discrete bogs in the southeastern section of the National Wildlife Area. It also protects the Sand Pond Watershed.

Wildlife includes birds such as ruffed grouse, American woodcock, and song sparrow; mammals including snowshoe hare, coyote, and bobcat; amphibians and reptiles such as green frog, spring peeper, and yellow-spotted salamander; and fish including shiners and brown bullhead.

Around 1895, the first farms were established on the uplands near Sand Pond, and forests were cleared. Sand Pond was drained by 1900 to facilitate cranberry farming. The site was designated as a National Wildlife Area in 1978, becoming Canada’s first National Wildlife Area.

== Geography ==
The Sand Pond National Wildlife Area comprises 531 hectares (1,310 acres) in area. The shallow rocky soil, common in southwestern Nova Scotia, is responsible for the lack of tree cover on much of the uplands. Upland habitats including forest, heath communities and oldfield is an ideal breeding and migration habitat for birds, such as dark-eyed junco and yellow warbler. The layer of soil is usually made of thin layers of sand and gravel material overlain in places by peat.

Poor drainage has resulted in the development of two discrete bogs in the southeast section of Sand Pond National Wildlife Area. Both of the bogs are characterized by vast carpets of sphagnum moss, cotton grass, and ericaceous shrubs. The northern and eastern shores of Sand Pond connect to a large portion of rocky upland known as “the Barrens”.

The National Wildlife Area protects a part of the Sand Pond Watershed, a 2,458 hectares (6,070 acres) watershed.

== Ecology ==
=== Mammals and birds ===
Birds, such as ruffed grouse, American woodcock, song sparrow, white-throated sparrow, dark-eyed junco, yellow warbler, northern parula, American redstart, purple finch, and American goldfinch breeds or migrates in the area. Mammals in the National Wildlife Area include the snowshoe hare, short-tailed weasel, muskrat, meadow jumping mouse, coyote, bobcat, white-tailed deer, and moose.

=== Reptiles and amphibians ===
Green frog, northern spring peeper, yellow spotted salamander, bull frog, wood frog, american toad, redback salamander, northern leopard frog, and maritime gardner frog has been found in the area.

=== Fish ===
Golden shiner, brown bullhead, yellow perch, white perch, brook trout has been found in the National Wildlife Area.

== History ==
In c. 1895, the first farms were built on the uplands close to Sand Pond. Forests were removed, and significant stone walls around the remnant was left. Sand Pond, the only lake in the National Wildlife Area, was drained as early as 1900 to facilitate cranberry farming. By 1968, the acquisition of land surrounding Sand Pond was mostly complete. Nova Scotia transferred administration and control of 96 hectares to CWS while purchasing the remaining 427 acres from 19 private landowners. It was gazetted as a National Wildlife Area in 1978, making it the first National Wildlife Area.

== Recreation ==
The wilderness area has a variety of activities, such as wildlife viewing, hiking, swimming, picking edible plants and mushrooms, boat launching and landing, motorized boating (with less than 10 horsepower), non-motorized boating, cross country skiing, and snowshoeing.

== Access ==
Sand Pond National Wildlife Area can be accessed via Nova Scotia Route 103, as well as minor forest roads.

== See also ==
- List of protected areas of Nova Scotia
- Argyle Head, Nova Scotia
