= St. Clair National Wildlife Area =

Nature reserve in Ontario, Canada

- IUCN category IV (habitat/species management area)
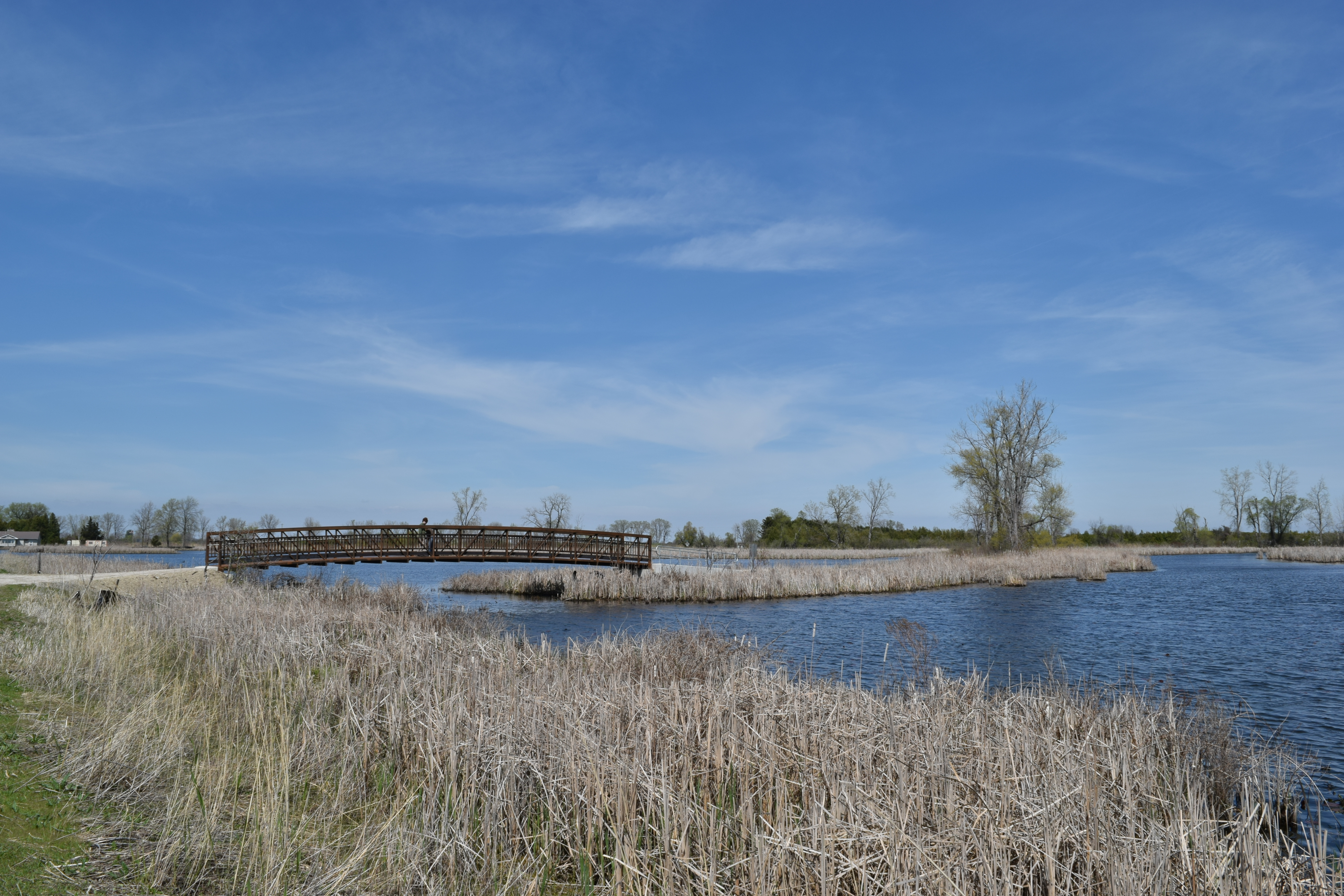
- Interactive map of St. Clair National Wildlife Area
- Nearest city: Chatham, Ontario
- Coordinates: 42°22′12″N 82°24′10″W
- Area: 355 hectares (880 acres; 1.37 sq mi)
- Governing body: Environment Canada

Ramsar Wetland
- Official name: St. Clair
- Designated: 16 October 1985
- Reference no.: 319

The St. Clair National Wildlife Area is a nature reserve located in the southwestern part of the Canadian province of Ontario, on eastern Lake St. Clair, west of Chatham. It consists of two properties: St. Clair (244 ha) and Bear Creek (111 ha), about 16 km apart.

The cattail marshes and small ponds along the lake shore here are an important stopover location for migrating waterfowl, including large numbers of tundra swans. The marshes also provide habitat for

- Yellow-headed blackbird
- King rail
- Black tern
- Least bittern

This area also provides habitat for several turtle species including the eastern spiny softshell turtle and Blanding's turtle.

This site has been recognized as a Wetland of International Significance under the Ramsar Convention, and is classified as a National Wildlife Area.

== Gallery ==
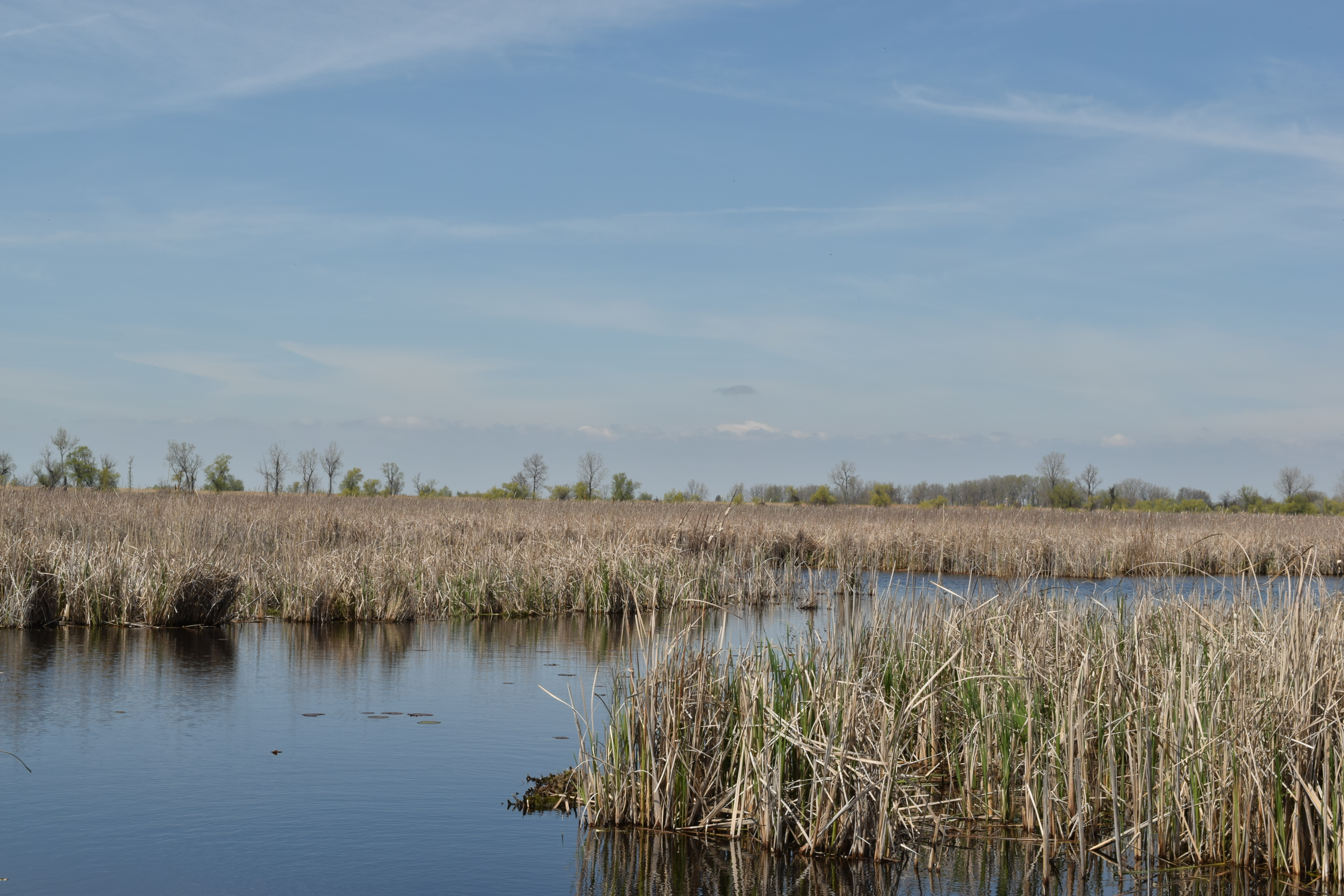

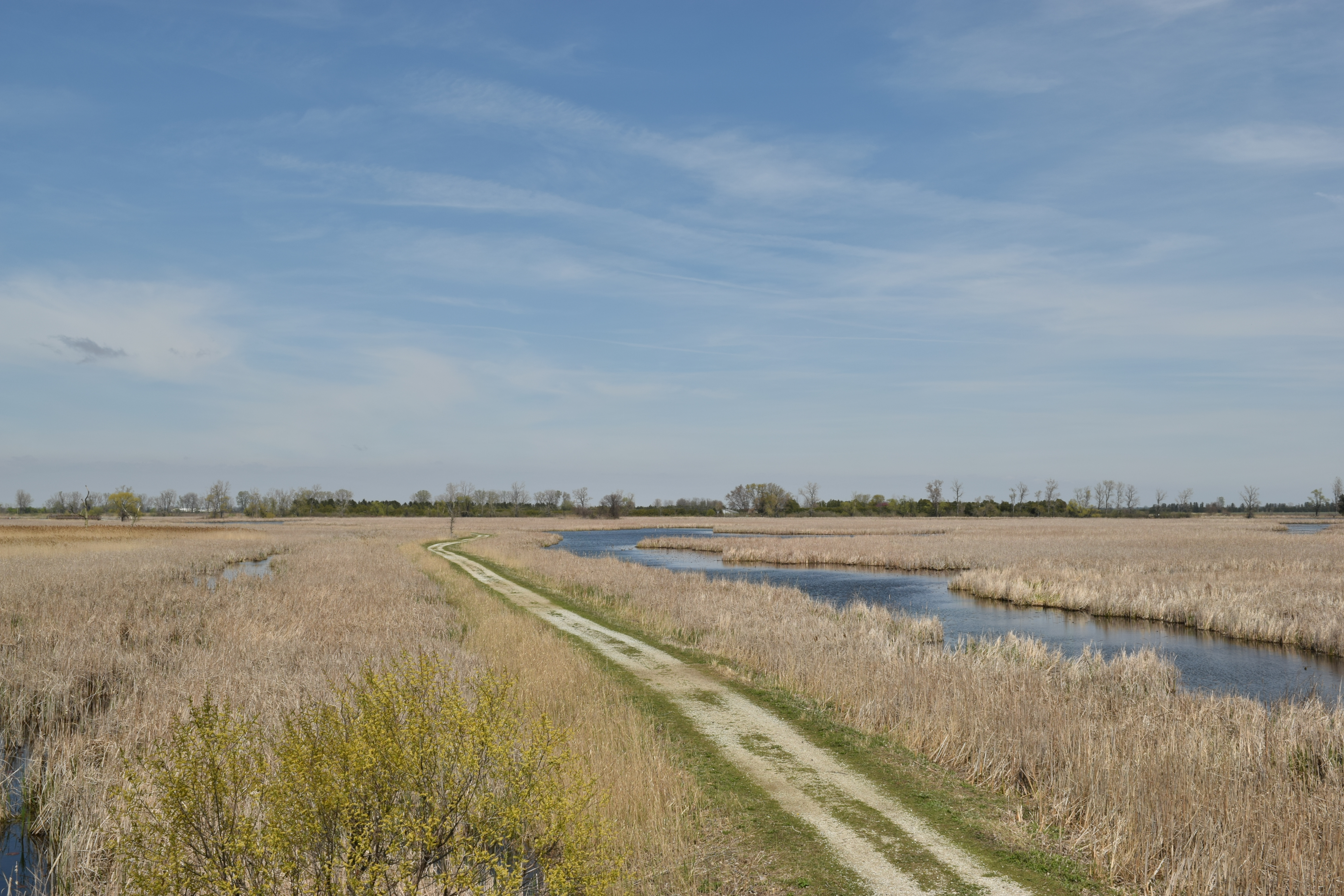

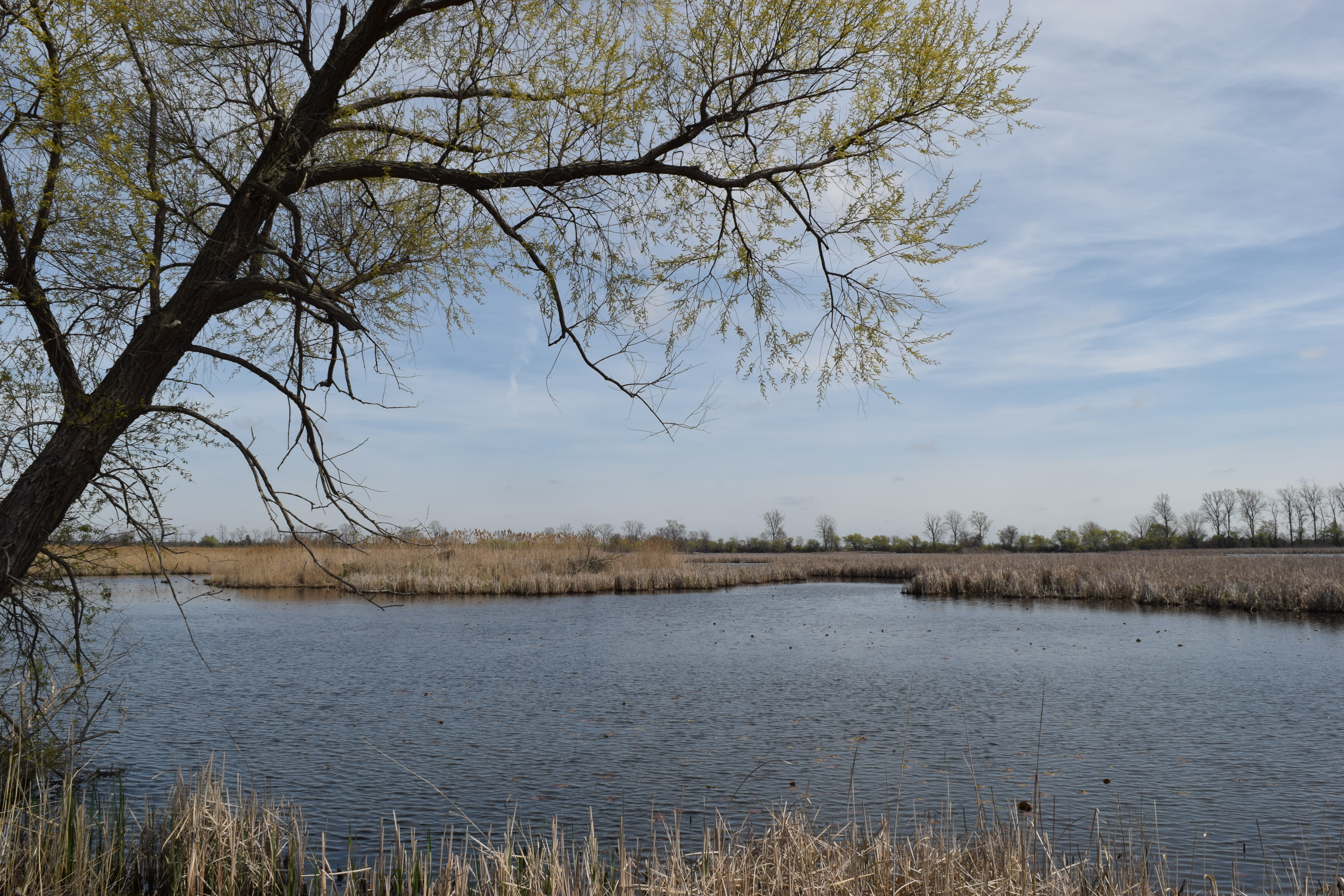
