= Pointe-au-Père, Quebec =

District of Rimouski, Quebec, Canada

Coordinates: 48°31′N 68°28′W

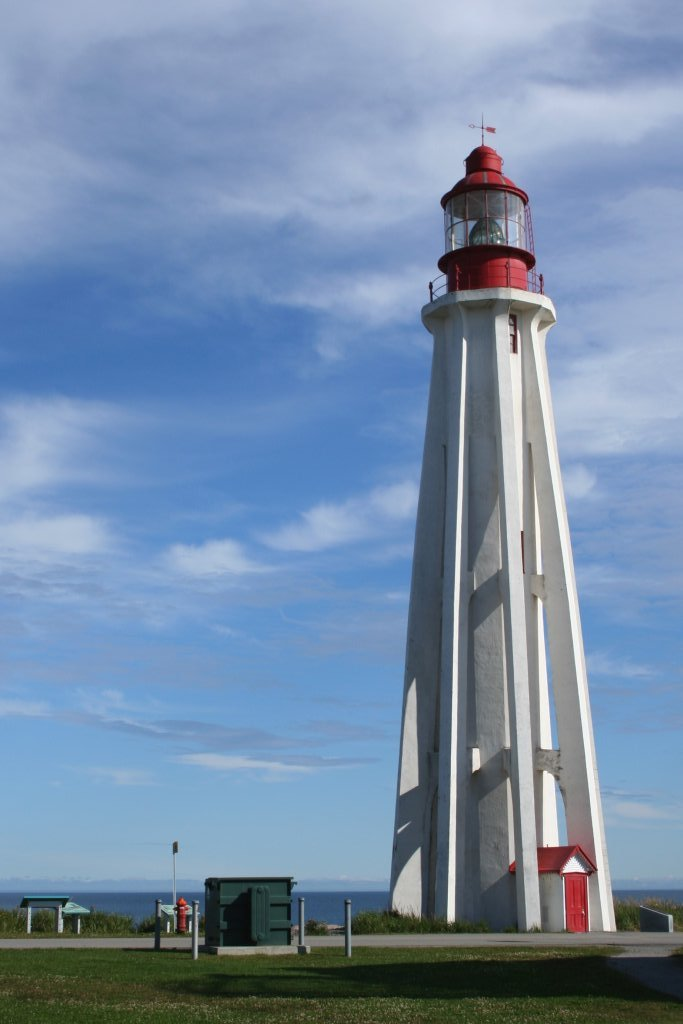
Pointe-au-Père Lighthouse

Pointe-au-Père (French pronunciation: [pwɛ̃t o pɛʁ]) is a district (secteur) of the city of Rimouski, Quebec, which is located in the central part of the Bas-Saint-Laurent region in eastern Quebec at the mouth of the St. Lawrence River. Its population was 4,240 in 2002, the year it merged with Rimouski. It is named after Father Henri Nouvel, who celebrated the first mass there in 1663.

Pointe-au-Père lighthouse along with the Site historique maritime de la Pointe-au-Père museum are major regional tourist attractions.

Murderer Dr Crippen was arrested when the steam ship SS Montrose, on which he was trying to escape with his mistress, who was disguised as his son, reached Pointe-au-Père.

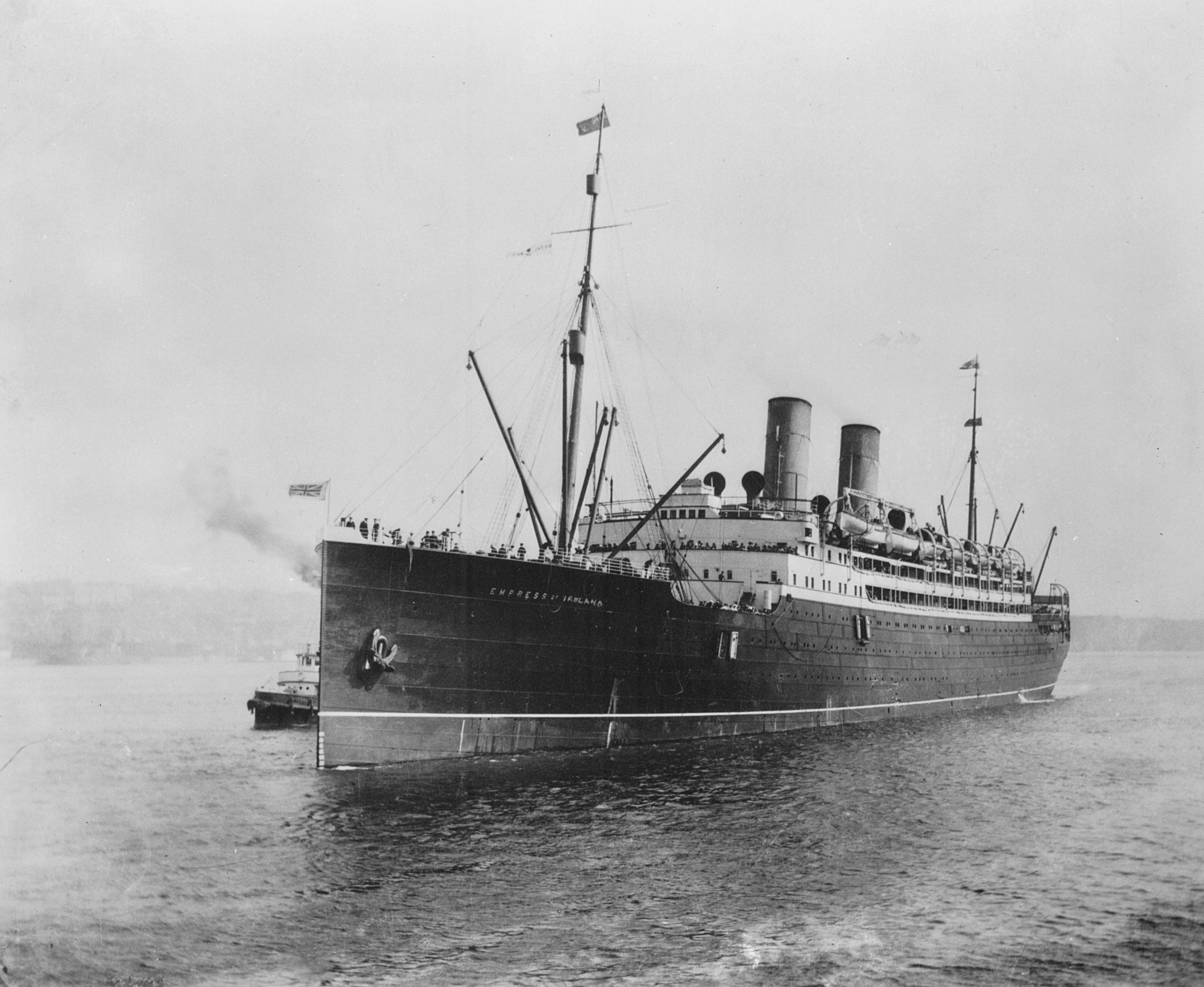
RMS Empress of Ireland

On May 29, 1914, the RMS Empress of Ireland sank in the Saint Lawrence River near this village, with a loss of 1,012 lives.

Pointe-au-Père tide station serves as the reference point for measuring mean sea level for the North American Vertical Datum of 1988, which is the reference point for determining altitude in North America.

Since 1986, the Government of Canada officially created the Pointe-au-Père National Wildlife Area, which houses a variety of fauna and flora, very popular for birdwatchers.
