= Carex paleacea =

Conservation status
- Least Concern (IUCN 3.1)

Scientific classification
- Kingdom: Plantae
- Clade: Tracheophytes
- Clade: Angiosperms
- Clade: Monocots
- Clade: Commelinids
- Order: Poales
- Family: Cyperaceae
- Genus: Carex
- Species: C. paleacea

Binomial name
- Carex paleacea Schreb. ex Wahlenb.
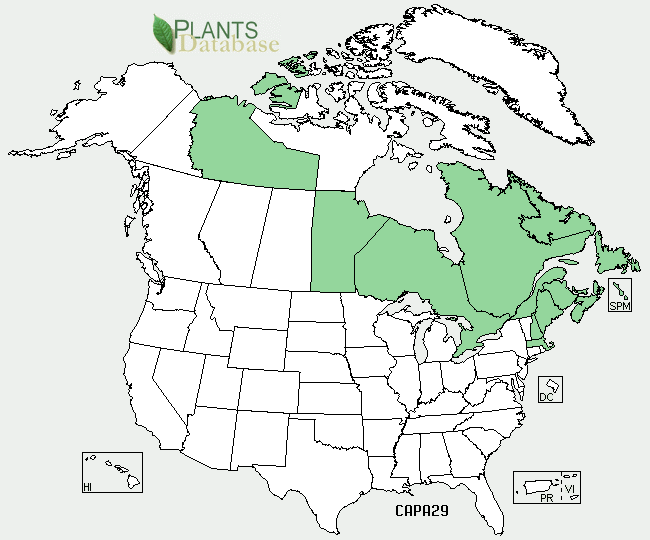

Species of grass-like plant

Carex paleacea, the chaffy sedge, is one of the 579 species of Carex. The Wetland Indicator Status for the species is classified as "obligate wetland" (OBL), occurring 99% of the time in a typical salt marsh environment when conditions are favorable.
