= National Wildlife Area =

Conservation status for a geographical region in Canada

A National Wildlife Area is a conservation designation for a geographical region in Canada that restricts most human activities on that region. However, land use permits may be issued "for activities that are compatible with conservation". Such areas are established and managed by the Canadian Wildlife Service, a division of Environment and Climate Change Canada. They may consist of land and water features, including any part of Canada's internal waters, territorial sea or exclusive economic zone.

The largest national wildlife area is the Scott Islands Marine National Wildlife Area in British Columbia, which covers an area of 11,570.65 km^{2} (4,467.45 sq mi).

== Protections ==
Each National Wildlife Area involves a management plan which specifies activities which are generally allowed within the protected area, as well as activities requiring permits. Under the Wildlife Area Regulations, traditional, personal and recreational activities such as hunting, fishing, or canoeing are allowed, whereas resource extraction or livestock grazing would be permitted only under the authority of a yearly permit with strict limits. Some National Wildlife Area in the territories, such as Polar Bear Pass, require co-management between federal government agencies and the Inuit, per the Nunavut Land Claims Agreement.

== List of national wildlife areas ==
As of 2026, there are 64 National Wildlife Areas in Canada, listed below by province or territory.

=== Alberta ===
- Blue Quills National Wildlife Area, 0.97 km^{2} (0.37 sq mi)
- Meanook National Wildlife Area, 2.14 km^{2} (0.83 sq mi)
- Spiers Lake National Wildlife Area, 0.64 km^{2} (0.25 sq mi)
- Suffield National Wildlife Area, 450 km^{2} (170 sq mi)

=== British Columbia ===
- Alaksen National Wildlife Area, (Note: Recognized as a Wetland of International Significance under the Ramsar Convention.) 3.49 km^{2} (1.35 sq mi)
- Columbia National Wildlife Area, 10.02 km^{2} (3.87 sq mi)
- Qualicum National Wildlife Area, 0.78 km^{2} (0.30 sq mi)
- Scott Islands Marine National Wildlife Area, 11,571 km^{2} (4,468 sq mi)
- Vaseux-Bighorn National Wildlife Area, 8.04 km^{2} (3.10 sq mi)
- Widgeon Valley National Wildlife Area, 1.25 km^{2} (0.48 sq mi)

=== Manitoba ===
- Pope National Wildlife Area, 0.29 km^{2} (0.11 sq mi)
- Rockwood National Wildlife Area, 0.31 km^{2} (0.12 sq mi)

=== New Brunswick ===
- Cape Jourimain National Wildlife Area, 6.54 km^{2} (2.53 sq mi)
- Portage Island National Wildlife Area, 3.49 km^{2} (1.35 sq mi)
- Portobello Creek National Wildlife Area, 30.11 km^{2} (11.63 sq mi)
- Shepody National Wildlife Area, 10.62 km^{2} (4.10 sq mi)
- Tintamarre National Wildlife Area, 19.70 km^{2} (7.61 sq mi)

=== Northwest Territories ===
- Edéhzhíe National Wildlife Area, 14,218 km^{2} (5,490 sq mi)

=== Nova Scotia ===
- Big Glace Bay Lake National Wildlife Area, 3.92 km^{2} (1.51 sq mi)
- Boot Island National Wildlife Area, 1.07 km^{2} (0.41 sq mi)
- Chignecto National Wildlife Area, 4.32 km^{2} (1.67 sq mi)
- Country Island National Wildlife Area, 0.21 km^{2} (0.081 sq mi)
- Isle Haute National Wildlife Area, 0.80 km^{2} (0.31 sq mi)
- John Lusby Marsh National Wildlife Area, 5.52 km^{2} (2.13 sq mi)
- Sand Pond National Wildlife Area, 5.31 km^{2} (2.05 sq mi)
- Sea Wolf Island National Wildlife Area, 0.76 km^{2} (0.29 sq mi)
- St. Paul Island National Wildlife Area, 4.78 km^{2} (1.85 sq mi)
- Wallace Bay National Wildlife Area, 5.81 km^{2} (2.24 sq mi)

=== Nunavut ===
- Akpait National Wildlife Area, 791 km^{2} (305 sq mi)
- Nanuit Itillinga National Wildlife Area, 2,637 km^{2} (1,018 sq mi)
- Ninginganiq National Wildlife Area, 3,364 km^{2} (1,299 sq mi)
- Nirjutiqavvik National Wildlife Area, 1,783 km^{2} (688 sq mi)
- Qaqulluit National Wildlife Area, 398 km^{2} (154 sq mi)

=== Ontario ===
- Big Creek National Wildlife Area, 7.66 km^{2} (2.96 sq mi)
- Eleanor Island National Wildlife Area, 0.008 km^{2} (0.0031 sq mi)
- Long Point National Wildlife Area, 32.63 km^{2} (12.60 sq mi)
- Mississippi Lake National Wildlife Area, 3.22 km^{2} (1.24 sq mi)
- Mohawk Island National Wildlife Area, 0.013 km^{2} (0.0050 sq mi)
- Prince Edward Point National Wildlife Area, 5.46 km^{2} (2.11 sq mi)
- Scotch Bonnet Island National Wildlife Area, 0.01 km^{2} (0.0039 sq mi)
- St. Clair National Wildlife Area, 3.55 km^{2} (1.37 sq mi)
- Wellers Bay National Wildlife Area, 0.83 km^{2} (0.32 sq mi)
- Wye Marsh National Wildlife Area, 0.47 km^{2} (0.18 sq mi)

=== Quebec ===
- Baie de l'Isle-Verte National Wildlife Area, 5.69 km^{2} (2.20 sq mi)
- Cap Tourmente National Wildlife Area, 23.11 km^{2} (8.92 sq mi)
- Estuary Islands National Wildlife Area, 4.04 km^{2} (1.56 sq mi)
- Îles de Contrecoeur National Wildlife Area, 2.99 km^{2} (1.15 sq mi)
- Îles de la Paix National Wildlife Area, 1.29 km^{2} (0.50 sq mi)
- Lake Saint-François National Wildlife Area, 13.17 km^{2} (5.08 sq mi)
- Pointe-au-Père National Wildlife Area, 0.22 km^{2} (0.085 sq mi)
- Pointe de l'Est National Wildlife Area, 7.24 km^{2} (2.80 sq mi)

=== Saskatchewan ===
Saskatchewan's former Prairie National Wildlife Area was delisted in 2025 because only seven of the 26 separate parcels of land it covered throughout the province were deemed to have high conservation value. Those seven parcels of land were reorganised into five new National Wildlife Areas: Great Sandhills, Harris Sandhills, Longspur, Moose Mountain Creek, and Thickwood Hills.

- Bradwell National Wildlife Area, 1.23 km^{2} (0.47 sq mi)
- Great Sandhills National Wildlife Area, 4.75 km^{2} (1.83 sq mi)
- Harris Sandhills National Wildlife Area, 3.72 km^{2} (1.44 sq mi)
- Last Mountain Lake National Wildlife Area, 109.06 km^{2} (42.11 sq mi)
- Longspur National Wildlife Area, 1.93 km^{2} (0.75 sq mi)
- Moose Mountain Creek National Wildlife Area, 1.63 km^{2} (0.63 sq mi)
- Raven Island National Wildlife Area, 0.94 km^{2} (0.36 sq mi)
- St. Denis National Wildlife Area, 3.61 km^{2} (1.39 sq mi)
- Stalwart National Wildlife Area, 12.50 km^{2} (4.83 sq mi)
- Thickwood Hills National Wildlife Area, 2.99 km^{2} (1.15 sq mi)
- Tway National Wildlife Area, 2.50 km^{2} (0.97 sq mi)
- Webb National Wildlife Area, 4.31 km^{2} (1.66 sq mi)

=== Yukon ===
- Nisutlin River Delta National Wildlife Area, 54.83 km^{2} (21.17 sq mi)

== See also ==
- List of Migratory Bird Sanctuaries of Canada
