= Nova Scotia Environmental and Heritage Acts =

Special Places Protection Act

Nova Scotia is a province rich in resources, both environmental and cultural or historical, and, as such, has set forth a number of policies and acts in order to protect these assets. The main Act which pertains to this is the Special Places Protection Act, written in 1989. This Act discusses the procedures related to the protection, or "An Act to Provide for the Preservation, Regulation and Study of Archaeological and Historical Remains and Palaeontological and Ecological Sites".

Nova Scotia, Canada

== Environmental Assessments ==
An Environmental Assessment is a process through which developments are ascertained to be sustainable, according to certain agreements laid out in the assessment. This assures that environmental impacts will not be too substantial and detrimental to the surrounding area and habitat. The environment is defined as “[t]he components of the earth that include:

- air, land and water;
- the layers of the atmosphere;
- organic and inorganic matter and living organisms;
- the interacting systems that include components referred to in (i) to (iii);
- and the socio-economic, environmental health, cultural and other items referred to in the definition of environmental effect”

Environmental Assessments are not necessary for buildings established before July 14, 1989, however if they have been modified since that time, an EA may be necessary. There are two classes of potential projects, known as Class 1 and Class 2. Class 1 projects tend to be smaller scale projects, or projects which may not cause a large environmental impact, often things such as highways or mines. This type of project will go through the Minister, who will decide if public hearings are required. Class 2 projects are normally larger scale undertakings, or could cause significant environmental impacts, such as solid waste incinerators or pulp and paper plants. This type of project requires an environmental assessment report as well as a public review. It is important, in terms of either classification of project, that the Mi'kmaq community be involved in the process. Proponents are asked to engage in the following ways:

1. Mutual Respect
2. Early Engagement in the project
3. Openness and Transparency
4. Adequate Time to Review/Respond

Certain factors which pertain to the Minister's decision are as follows:

- "the location of the proposed undertaking and the nature and sensitivity of the surrounding area;
- the size, scope and complexity of the proposed undertaking;
- concerns expressed by the public and aboriginal people about the adverse effects or the environmental effects of the proposed undertaking;
- steps taken by the proponent to address environmental concerns expressed by the public and aboriginal people;
- whether environmental baseline information submitted under subclause 9(1A)(b)(x) for the undertaking is sufficient for predicting adverse effects or environmental effects related to the undertaking;
- potential and known adverse effects or environmental effects of the proposed undertaking, including identifying any effects on species at risk, species of conservation concern and their habitats;
- project schedules where applicable;
- planned or existing land use in the area of the undertaking;
- other undertakings in the area;
- whether compliance with licences, certificates, permits, approvals or other documents of authorization required by law will mitigate the environmental effects;
- such other information as the Minister may require.”

For a Class 1 undertaking, the Minister must inform the proponent of issues with the registration process, such as lack of information, before 50 days have passed. These time-lines may be extended by the Minister if it is seen that more information or a report is necessary. Information pertaining to an EA can be read by any member of the public, and there are often public hearings related to developments. An opportunity must be given for comments to be taken into consideration, and these comments may come from any of the following groups:

- "the public;
- departments of Government;
- the Government of Canada and its agencies;
- municipalities in the vicinity of the undertaking or in which the undertaking is located;
- any affected aboriginal people or cultural community; and
- neighbouring jurisdictions to Nova Scotia in the vicinity of the undertaking."

The proponent is also required to publish in at least one local and one Provincial newspaper with information explaining the EA to be undertaken. Since the year 2000, 92 projects have had reviews completed, the most recent being the Pugwash Wind Farm. Five projects are currently being considered.

== Schedule A of the Environmental Act (Triggers) ==
If a potential development falls into any of the following categories, it is required to undergo an Environmental Assessment.

	Class I	Class II
Industrial Facilities	1. A storage facility that has a total storage capacity of over 5000 m3 and is intended to hold liquid or gaseous substances, such as hydrocarbons or chemicals other than water.; 2. A facility for manufacturing wood products that are pressure treated with chemical products.; 3. A facility that produces fish meal.; 4. A rendering plant.; 5. An onshore pipeline that is 5 km or longer, other than a pipeline that carries any of the following: (a) natural gas, if the pipeline has a maximum operating pressure below 3450 kPa (500 psig); (b) water; (c) steam; (d) domestic wastewater.: 6. A natural gas processing plant.; 7. A paper product manufacturing plant.; 8. An oil refinery that; (a) produces no more than 15,000 L of hydrocarbon products per day; and (b) uses a feedstock that meets all of the following criteria: (i) it contains no more than 1% sulphur or sulphur compounds by weight; (ii) it does not contain halogenated compounds..	1. A facility for manufacturing, processing or reprocessing radioactive materials.; 2. A heavy water plant.; 3. A pulp mill.; 4. A petrochemical manufacturing plant.; 5. A cement plant.; 6. An oil refinery other than an oil refinery listed as a Class 1 undertaking.; 7. A non-ferrous or ferrous metal smelter.; 8. A lead acid battery plant.; 9. A ferro-alloy plant.
Mining	1. A facility that extracts or processes any of the following: (a) metallic or non-metallic minerals; (b) coal; (c) peat; (d) peat moss; (e) gypsum; (f) limestone; (g) bituminous shale; (h) oil shale.: 2. A pit or quarry, other than a pit or quarry exempted under Section 4 of the regulations for the Department of Transportation and Infrastructure Renewal, that is larger than 4 ha in area for extracting one of the following: (a) ordinary stone; (b) building or construction stone; (c) sand; (d) gravel; (e) ordinary soil.	N/A
Transportation	1. The construction of a new paved highway that is longer than 2 km and is designed for 4 or more lanes of traffic.; 2. The construction of a new paved highway that is longer than 10 km and is designed for 2 or more lanes of traffic.	N/A
Energy	1. A corridor for 1 or more electric power transmission lines that have a cumulative voltage rating equal to or greater than 345 kVA.; 2. An energy generating facility, other than an emergency generator, that meets any one of the following: (a) it has a production rating of at least 2 MW derived from wind, tides or waves; (b) it has a production rating of at least 2 MW and no more than 25 MW derived from hydroelectricity, other than run-of-the-river facilities under 10 MW; (c) it has a daily fuel input rating of at least 11 000 GJ and no more than 31 000 GJ derived from natural gas; (d) it has a daily fuel input rating of at least 250 GJ and no more than 2500 GJ derived from fossil fuels other than natural gas; (e) it has a daily fuel input rating of at least 4000 GJ and no more than 10 000 GJ derived from fuels other than fossil fuels, but excluding solar power.	1. An energy generating facility, other than an emergency generator, that meets any one of the following: (a) it has a production rating of more than 25 MW derived from hydroelectricity; (b) it has a daily fuel input rating of more than 31 000 GJ derived from natural gas; (c) it has a daily fuel input rating of more than 2500 GJ derived from fossil fuels other than natural gas; (d) it has a daily fuel input rating of more than 10 000 GJ from fuels other than fossil fuels, but excluding solar power.: 2. A water reservoir that has a storage capacity of 10 000 000 m3 or more than the mean volume of the natural water body source for which it is a reservoir.
Waste Management	1. A facility for storing, processing, treating or disposing of waste dangerous goods that were not produced at that facility, other than facilities operated by, or on behalf of, a municipality or Provincial agency for waste dangerous goods collected only from residential premises.; 2. A facility for treating, processing or disposing of contaminated materials that is located at a site other than where the contaminated materials originated.	1. A facility for incinerating municipal solid waste.
Other	1. An undertaking that involves transferring water between drainage basins, if the drainage area containing the water to be diverted is larger than 1 km2.; 2. An undertaking that disrupts a total of 2 ha or more of any wetland.	N/A

== Special Places Protection Act ==
The Special Places Protection Act is an Act which defines special places, and enforces their protection. Any land, including that which is covered with water, with significant archaeological, historical or palaeontological importance. A Committee has been established to oversee the act, in association with the Minister, and they have the power to:

- "make recommendations to the Minister concerning the administration, classification and acquisition of special places;
- conduct research with respect to existing and possible future special places;
- recommend regulations to the Minister with respect to management plans and other matters related to ecological sites;
- conduct research concerning the possible removal from designation of existing special places;
- ensure that, if a special places designation is being considered that appears to effect the operation of some other public Act, the persons charged with the administration of that Act have the opportunity to make representations to the Committee before any recommendations are made to the Minister;
- do any other thing which the Minister may assign the Committee with respect to assisting him in the proper administration of this Act.”

Every time a site is designated as protected, it must be published in at least one edition of the Royal Gazette, to alert the public as to the information. The site may have signs and indicators posted which state it is a protected site, although these are not required.

If a protected site is seen as unnecessarily protected, the Committee can request that the protection be terminated. In this case, again, information must be circulated via newspaper, and if the land is privately owned, notice had to be served to the owner. Thirty days must be given, to allot time for people to submit comments on this process.

Heritage permits are required to “carry out explorations or make excavations on any land in the Province, including land covered with water, for the purpose of seeking heritage objects”. These heritage permits can be issued by the Minister in order to undertake archaeological, historical, or palaeontological explorations. A permit holder must submit a report about the work done, and they must deliver all found heritage objects, to a public institution designated by the Minister. The permit holder must gain consent from the owner of the land before collecting objects from it or exploring on it. A permit may be cancelled by the Minister at any point.

If a place which the Minister deems to be a special place, whether designated or not, is threatened, the Minister may force the encroaching project to stop for 30 days, during which a survey of the area will take place.

Certain areas may be designated by the Minister as ecological sites, for which a management plan must be created, and information about the ecological site must be published in The Royal Gazette. An ecological site is described as follows: “(a) runs with the land to which it applies and binds all successors in title to the land or any estate in the land unless the designation is terminated pursuant to this Act; and (b) is not affected by any tax deed conveying the land to which it applies. (9) Subsection (8) applies to all designations of ecological sites whether made before or after the coming into force of that subsection.” Treatment of ecological sites is the same as designated special places, such as in terms of termination or management. Ecological research permits can also be issued by the Minister, which allow for the alteration of land and the ecology within it, for the purposes of study.

Anyone in violation of the SPPA, whether as a non-permit holder, or by failing to comply with the regulation, is “liable on summary conviction to a penalty not exceeding ten thousand dollars". If it is a corporation in violation of the Act, a maximum penalty of one hundred thousand dollars may be incurred.

== Treasure Trove Act ==
Nova Scotia also had what was known as the Treasure Trove Act (“TTA”), which was the only one of its kind within North America, and allowed those with a license to seek and remove treasure found within a certain area. “Treasure” was considered to be “precious stones or metals in a state other than their natural state”. While it was in place, although the TTA and the SPPA were not connected, the TTA took into consideration the permits required by the SPPA. Despite this, there was much controversy related to the TTA, as it was seen to have treated “archaeological or heritage objects as a natural resource with commercial value”. The TTA was repealed, and as of December 31, 2010, licenses to all activity, except for those pertaining to Oak Island expired.

== Fantome ==
One controversial case relating to marine archaeology in Nova Scotia was that of HMS Fantome. Fantome was a British Royal Navy brig in the War of 1812, which sank off the coast of Nova Scotia, near Prospect, in November 1814. Treasure hunters claimed that the ship was carrying cargo taken from the British raid on the White House on August 24, 1814 and that Presidential silverware may be entombed in the wreck, leading some American citizens to call for repatriation. However Fantome played no part in the Washington raid and historical research shows Fantome was carrying goods and customs revenue from British-occupied Castine, Maine. This issue was also controversial because of the recovery methods used by the company given license to the wreck, who employed the same conservator and underwater archaeologist as the Nuestra Señora de Atocha project, a recovery which has been criticized for its “crude recovery techniques”.
