= Canadian Wildlife Service =

Branch of the Department of Environment and Climate Change Canada

- Service canadien de la faune
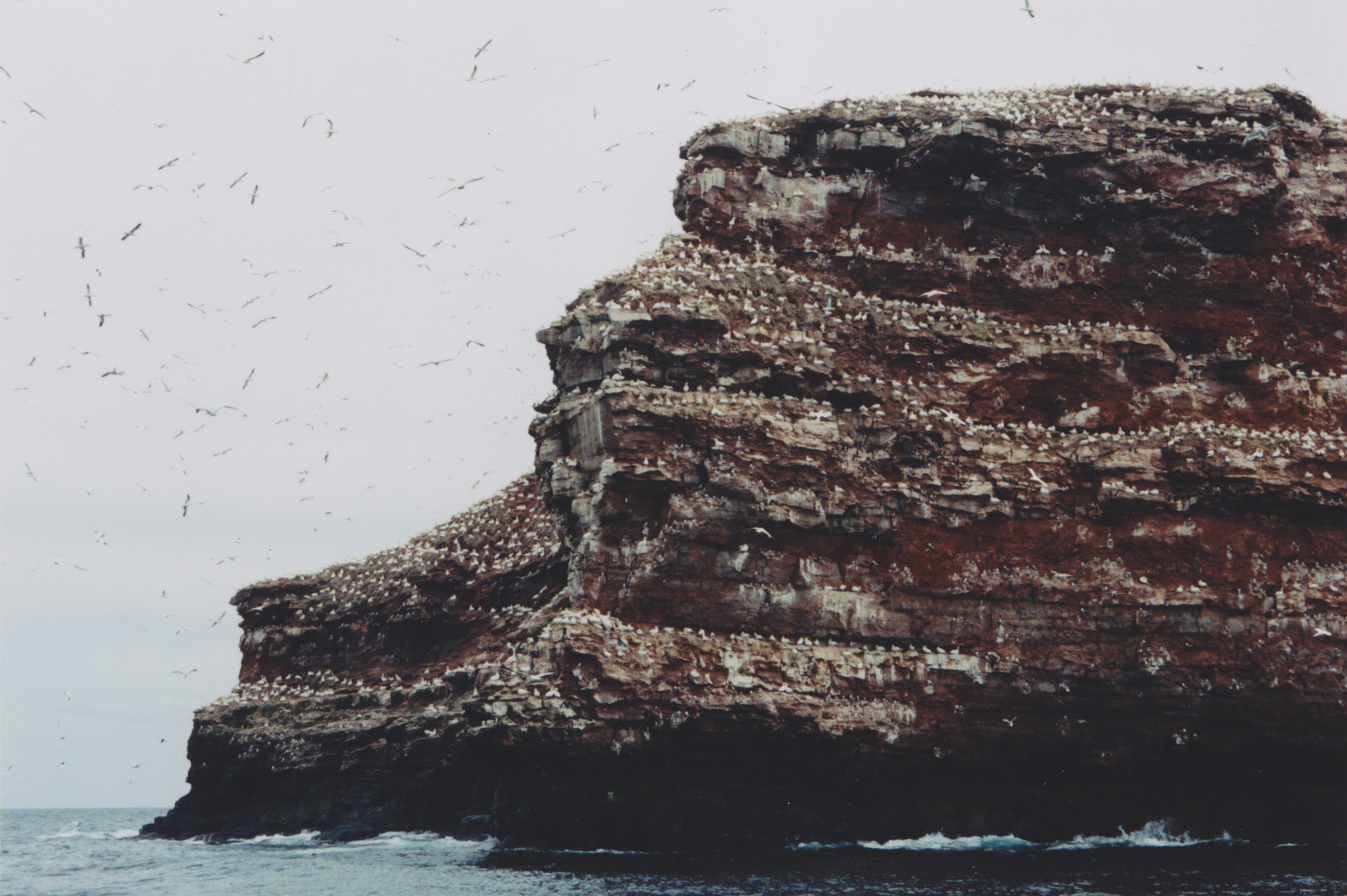
- Bird Rocks, Magdalan Island, Quebec

Agency overview
- Formed: November 1, 1947
- Headquarters: Ottawa
- Employees: 550
- Parent department: Environment and Climate Change Canada
- Parent agency: Government of Canada
- Website: Official website of Canadian Wildlife Service

The Canadian Wildlife Service or CWS (French: Service canadien de la faune), is a Branch of the Department of Environment and Climate Change Canada, a department of the Government of Canada. Founded in 1947 as Dominion Wildlife Service, it is Canada's national wildlife agency responsible for the protection and management of migratory birds, endangered species and nationally important wildlife habitats. Until 2026, the Canadian Wildlife Service (original named the Dominions Wildlife Service) have been in existence for 79 years, the agency has worked on multiple fronts to provide conservation and policy support for Canada's wildlife over the half century.

CWS conducts scientific research and monitoring, develops policies and regulations, manages permits, and provides financial and technical support for conservation programs. It manages 54 national wildlife areas and 92 migratory bird sanctuaries across Canada and plays a key role in implementing federal legislation, such as the Migratory Birds Convention Act, the Species at Risk Act and the Canada Wildlife Act. The service works with provincial, territorial and indigenous governments as well as international partners and non-governmental organizations. Throughout its history, CWS has contributed to public education and awareness through initiatives such as the Hinterland Who's Who series, and has supported research on issues such as toxicology, habitat loss and the impact of climate change on wildlife.

== Core responsibilities ==
The core responsibility of the Canadian Wildlife Service are the protection and management of migratory birds, species at risk, and their nationally important habitats. Functions of the Canadian Wildlife Service include scientific, regulatory, property management, policy, and financial support work. Scientific monitoring of migratory bird and species at risk population sizes and distribution, wetlands and critical habitats occurs throughout Canada.

Biologists employed by the Canadian Wildlife Service also review environmental assessments, and review and issue permits under the Migratory Bird Regulations, Migratory Bird Sanctuary Regulations, Wildlife Area Regulations, and Species at Risk Act.

Prior to 2006 the Canadian Wildlife Service was also home to wildlife research and enforcement staff. Wildlife research is now a part of the Science and Technology Branch, and Enforcement is now a separate Branch. Wildlife research is predominantly waterfowl and seabird population ecology and toxicology, with a few scientists addressing reptiles, polar bears, and caribou. Enforcement perform compliance promotion, patrols, and investigations under powers from the Migratory Birds Convention Act, Canada Wildlife Act, Species at Risk Act, Convention on International Trade in Endangered Species, and Wild Animal and Plant Protection and Regulations of International and Interprovincial Trade Act.

Wildlife management in Canada is constitutionally a shared responsibility among the federal and provincial / territorial and Indigenous governments. Canadian Wildlife Service works closely with these governments on a wide variety of wildlife issues. CWS engages in cooperative management projects with a number of international and domestic non government agencies and funds a significant number of management and research or monitoring initiatives.

Canadian Wildlife Service in 2017 had approximately 550 staff, with offices in all Canadian provinces and territories except Prince Edward Island. The organization has a regional structure, with a Pacific Region (British Columbia), Northern Region (Yukon, Northwest Territories, Nunavut), Prairie Region (Alberta, Saskatchewan, Manitoba), Ontario Region, Quebec Region, and Atlantic Region (New Brunswick, Nova Scotia, Prince Edward Island, and Newfoundland and Labrador). Headquarters in Ottawa/Gatineau has the largest number of staff.

=== Wildlife Areas and Bird Sanctuaries ===
Canadian Wildlife Service also manages 54 National Wildlife Areas and 92 Migratory Bird Sanctuaries, primarily where key waterfowl and seabird nesting and staging habitats occur. Planning includes preparing Bird Conservation Region Plans under the North American Bird Conservation Initiative, and Recovery Strategies and Management Plans under the Species at Risk Act. Canadian Wildlife Service also leads or supports international and interprovincial agreements regarding biological diversity, alien invasive species, indigenous wildlife management boards, the Canadian Wildlife Directors Committee, and the Committee on the Status of Endangered Wildlife in Canada. Canadian Wildlife Service delivers many substantial funding programs that support other Federal Departments, Provinces and non-governmental agencies to protect and restore wildlife habitats. Those funds include Habitat Joint Ventures under the North American Waterfowl Management Plan, Interdepartmental Recovery Fund for Species at Risk, Habitat Stewardship Program for Species at Risk, Aboriginal Fund for Species At Risk, National Wetland Conservation Fund, and Species at Risk Partnerships on Agricultural Lands.

== History ==
CWS traces its history to the early 20th century with the decline and/or extinction of several species of migratory birds in eastern North America as a result of hunting, including the passenger pigeon. It became apparent to the federal government that the provincial responsibilities toward hunting regulation of migratory birds by various sub-national jurisdictions (provinces in Canada, states in the United States) was limited in scope.

In 1916, Great Britain (for Canada) and the United States of America signed the "Migratory Birds Convention", followed by the Parliament of Canada passing the Migratory Birds Convention Act in 1917, which gave the federal government responsibility for managing migratory bird species either harmless or beneficial to man. The Convention adopted a uniform system of protection for certain species of birds which migrate between the United States and Canada, in order to assure the preservation of species including setting dates for closed seasons on migratory birds and prohibiting hunting insectivorous birds, but allowed killing of birds under permit when injurious to agriculture. The Convention was amended by the Parksville protocol (initialled by the parties in 1995) to update and improve the conservation of migratory birds and to establish a legal framework for the subsistence take of birds. Canada implemented the Protocol by enacting the revised Migratory Birds Convention Act, 1994.

With the federal government's reorganization of the Department of Resources and Development, the Dominion Wildlife Service (DWS), was established in November 1947. As a part of the new Lands and Development Services Branch, it was not meant to be as much of a research organization, but a "development and administrative service." The DWS dealt with policy and methods in the conservation and management of wildlife resources. "Few people in the 1940s saw wildlife from a holistic point of view. Like trees, birds, mammals, and fish were generally viewed a resources to be responsibly managed for the purpose of generating long-terms economic returns." Wildlife was a national asset.

By 1950 the DWS was known as the Canadian Wildlife Service (CWS). Harrison Lewis was the first head of the new service, remaining in that post until his retirement in 1952. When the CWS was founded, important research on wildlife had been undertaken through the National Museum of Canada. After 1947, CWS scientists and technicians earned recognition for research including work on migratory birds, particularly waterfowl and sea birds, in addition to barren-ground caribou and polar bears in the northern territories. Although Last Mountain Lake Bird Sanctuary in Saskatchewan was first created in 1887, many Migratory Bird Sanctuaries were established in the 1950s and 60s, and National Wildlife Areas in the 1960s and 70s. In 1973, the Canada Wildlife Act was passed, giving the federal government clear authority to undertake wildlife research, acquire lands for wildlife conservation, and deliver interpretation activities. Significant growth of the organization occurred during this period, and CWS began providing broader wildlife research and management services to National Parks.

In the 1960s, 1970s and into the early 1980s, Canadian Wildlife Service produced Hinterland Who's Who, a successful series of 60-second educational public-service television clips about Canada's native wildlife. The first four black-and-white vignettes - on the beaver, the moose, the gannet, and the loon - were produced through a collaboration with the National Film Board and the CWS. The vignettes resulted in millions of pamphlets about wildlife being mailed in response to viewers' requests to CWS.

Individual Canadian Wildlife Service scientists and biologists became renowned for their work in conservation. Ernie Kuyt became well known for his pioneering work on the recovery of Whooping Cranes in Wood Buffalo National Park. Ian Stirling had a long career monitoring polar bear populations and discovering the effect of climate change on arctic ice and polar bear survival. Environmental contaminants and toxicological effects on wildlife became a significant focus of research programs in the 1960s and 70s. Tony Keith, director of the National Wildlife Research Centre from 1976 to 1996, presented his work on PCBs and the environment to the Organisation for Economic Co-operation and Development (OECD). David B. Peakall contributed to the OECD's adoption of "Minimum Pre-market Data" criteria regarding common standards for regulation and approval of new pesticides.

In the 1970s the Department of the Environment (now Environment and Climate Change Canada) was created. Environmental movements of that time encouraged a move away from the protection of individual species, towards a more holistic approach of protecting various ecosystems and the species that inhabited them. With the signing of the 1974 Canada-USA Great Lakes Water Quality Agreement, more funding became available. By 1975 David Peakall as WSC Division Chief was focusing his work on persistent bioaccumulatory organochlorines such as DDT, dieldrin and PCBs. The North American Waterfowl Management Plan (1986) lead to greatly increased funding and partnerships with Ducks Unlimited Canada and the Provinces to protect and enhance upland and wetland habitats for waterfowl, primarily in the Prairie Provinces. The Canadian Environmental Protection Act (1990) and Canadian Environmental Assessment Act (1994) further supported a need for toxicological research on waterbirds and aquatic ecosystems to support regulations and development decisions. In 1976 the Committee on the Status of Endangered Wildlife in Canada brought together experts in all taxa from across the country and began preparing lists of species at risk using criteria consistent with the International Union for the Conservation of Nature. By the late 1990s there was political support for a national endangered species law, and in 2002 the Accord for the Protection of Species At Risk in Canada was a precursor to the Species At Risk Act.

In spite of these increased responsibilities and public awareness, there were deep budget cuts in the 1980s that reduced CWS budgets and reduced staff by 23%. Later austerity budgeting in 1994 lead to more restructuring and elimination of vacant positions. The Fisheries Act (1986) transferred some responsibilities for aquatic ecosystem research to the Department of Fisheries and Oceans, but Canadian Wildlife Service also retracted from servicing the National Parks, cut caribou research in the Arctic, several interpretive centers opened in the early 1980s were closed by the late 1980s, and growth of the National Wildlife Areas and Migratory Bird Sanctuaries effectively ended during this period of time.

== SARA and Restructuring (2002–2006) ==
By 2006 the Canadian Wildlife Service had been restructured, with research scientists and enforcement officers moved to other Branches of Environment Canada. Publication series and public outreach functions were discontinued, and centralized control of communications reduced the freedom and frequency of CWS staff speaking at conferences or to the media. Attempts were made to eliminate the name "Canadian Wildlife Service" to something that reflected a broader role in biodiversity conservation, and the logo of the Loon adopted in the early 1980s was banned for use in official communications. By 2010 the Canadian Wildlife Service no longer had a homepage on-line, despite still existing as an organizational unit within Environment Canada (now Environment and Climate Change Canada). The changes were ushered in following a dramatic shift in human and financial resources away from migratory bird research and management to the administration and implementation of the Species at Risk Act. Ongoing departmental reorganizations through this time period also impacted the Service through the creation of centralized services.

== See also ==
- List of National Wildlife Areas in Canada
- List of Migratory Bird Sanctuaries of Canada
