= List of protected areas of British Columbia =

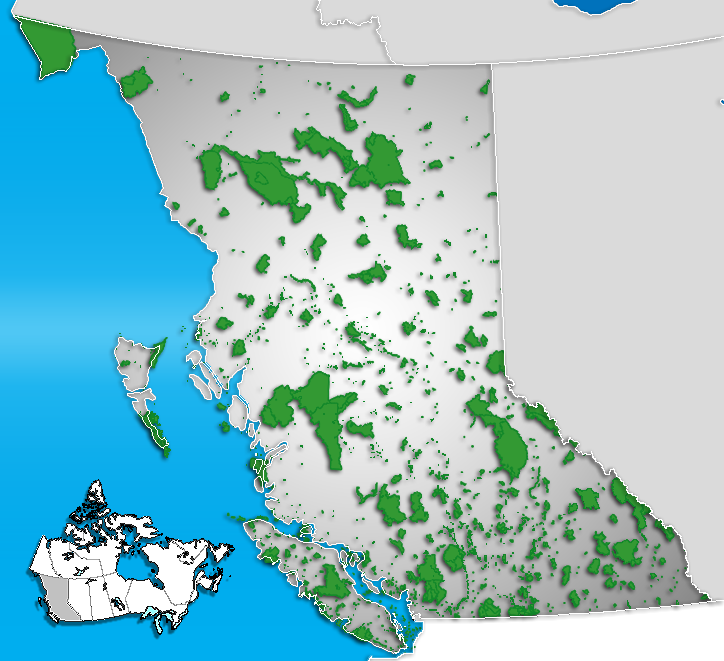
Protected Lands & Waters in British Columbia
Distribution and location of protected areas in British Columbia (2006)
Statistics (2015)
Type	Area
Type	Land	Water
National Protected Areas	0.7%	2.2%
BC Parks	14.4%	0.9%
BC Conservation Lands	0.26%	0.07%
NGO Conservation Lands	0.1%	–

The following list of protected areas of British Columbia includes all federally and provincially protected areas within the Canadian province of British Columbia. As of 2015, approximately 15.46% of the province's land area and 3.17% of the province's waters are protected.

== International recognition ==
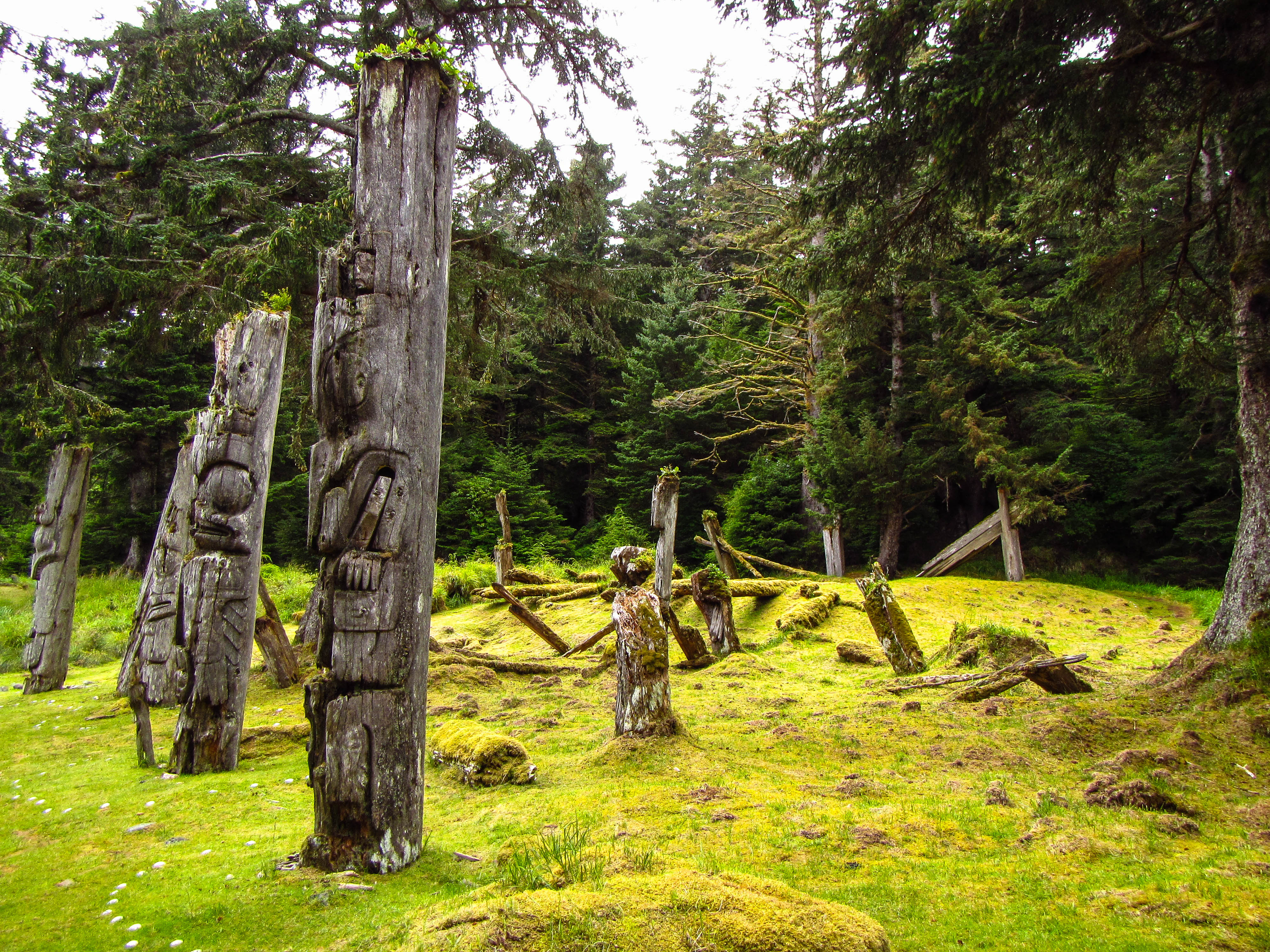
SG̱ang Gwaay in Haida Gwaii

Three UNESCO World Heritage Sites are entirely or partially located in British Columbia:

- Canadian Rocky Mountain Parks (shared with Alberta)
- Kluane / Wrangell–St. Elias / Glacier Bay / Tatshenshini-Alsek (shared with Yukon and Alaska, United States)
- SG̱ang Gwaay

Two UNESCO-MAB Biosphere Reserves are in British Columbia:

- Clayoquot Sound
- Mount Arrowsmith

== Federally protected areas ==
=== Parks Canada ===
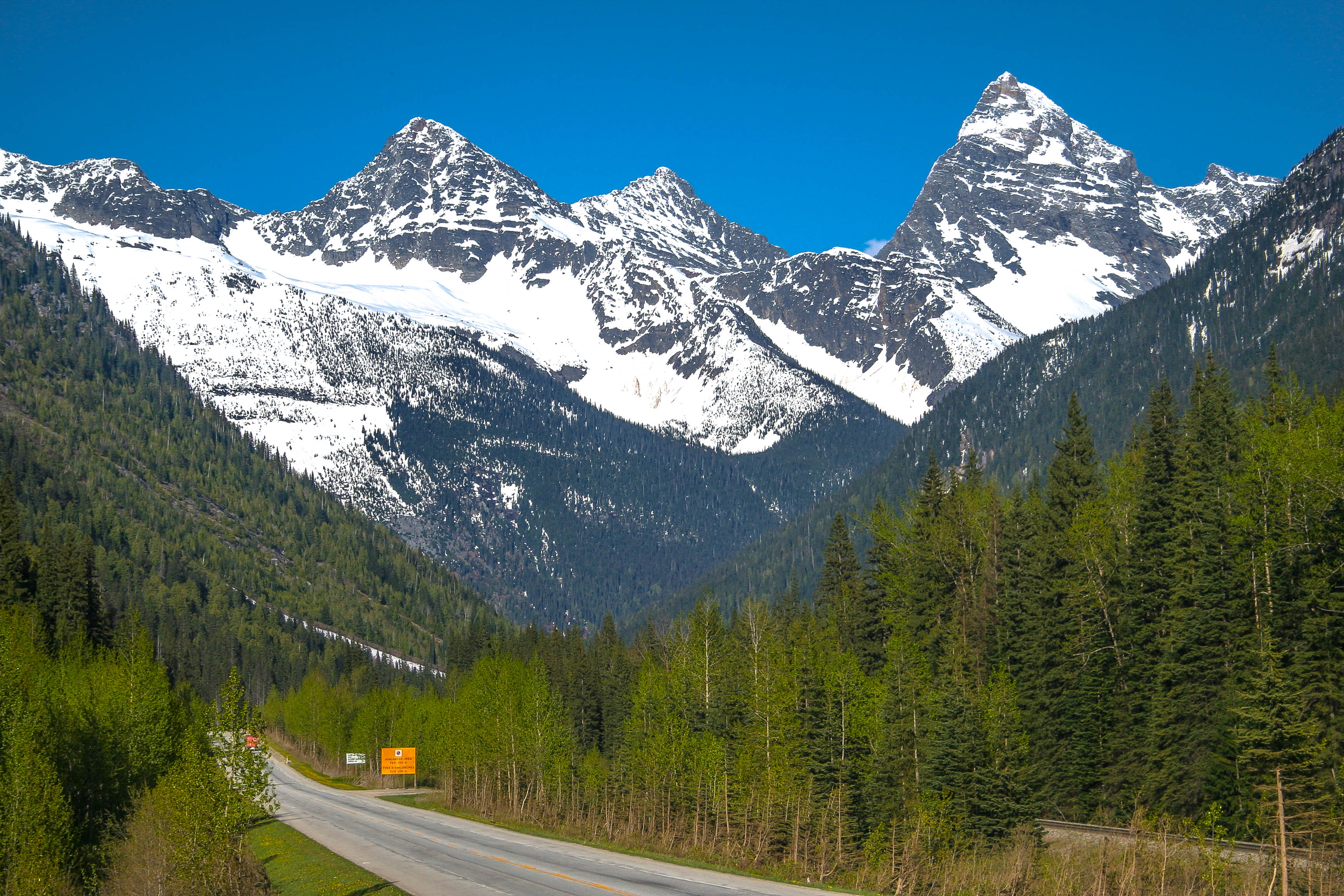
Glacier National Park near Revelstoke

Seven National Parks of Canada are located in British Columbia, more than any other province or territory:

- Glacier National Park
- Gulf Islands National Park Reserve
- Gwaii Haanas National Park Reserve
- Kootenay National Park
- Mount Revelstoke National Park
- Pacific Rim National Park Reserve
- South Okanagan—Similkameen National Park Reserve (proposed)
- Yoho National Park

One National Marine Conservation Area of Canada is located in British Columbia:

- Gwaii Haanas Reserve
- Southern Strait of Georgia Reserve (proposed)

There are numerous National Historic Sites of Canada in British Columbia, with 13 being operated by Parks Canada:

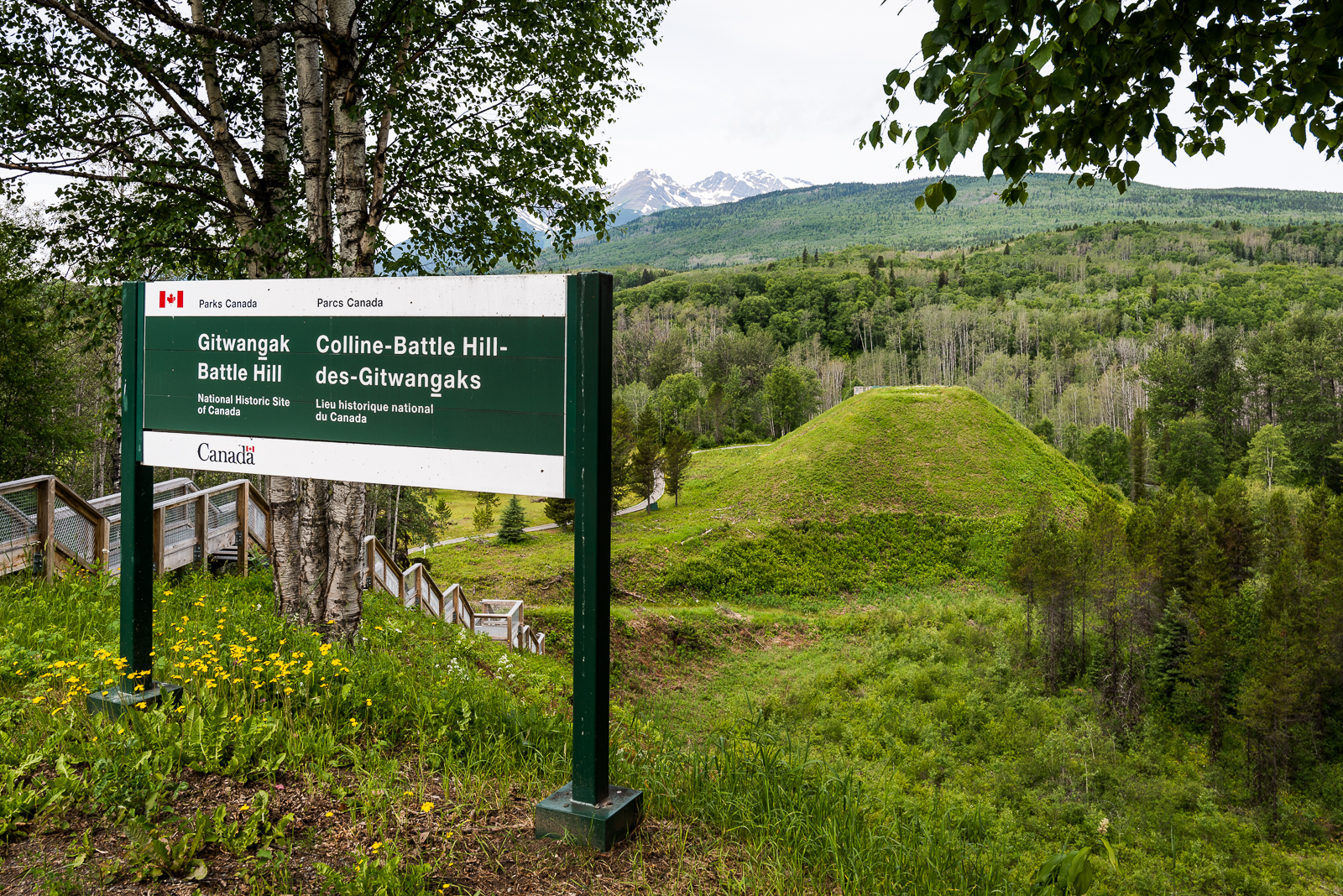
Gitwangak Battle Hill National Historic Site near Kitwanga

- Chilkoot Trail
- Fisgard Lighthouse
- Fort Langley
- Fort Rodd Hill
- Fort St. James
- Gitwangak Battle Hill
- Gulf of Georgia Cannery
- Kicking Horse Pass
- Kootanae House
- Nan Sdins
- Rogers Pass
- Stanley Park
- Twin Falls Tea House

=== Canadian Wildlife Service ===
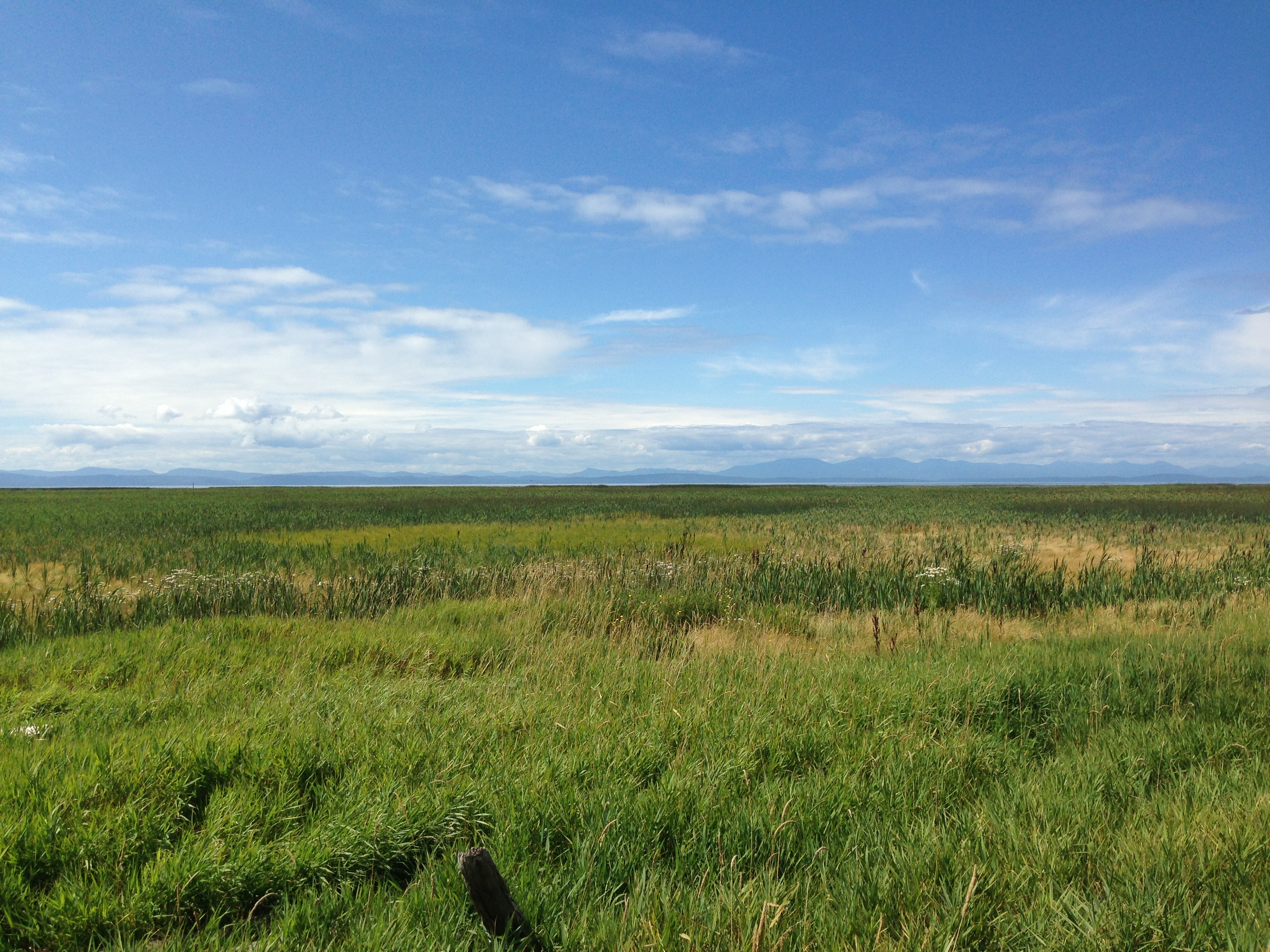
Alaksen National Wildlife Area in Delta

Six National Wildlife Areas of Canada are located in British Columbia:

- Alaksen
- Columbia
- Qualicum
- Scott Islands Marine
- Vaseux-Bighorn
- Widgeon Valley

Seven Migratory Bird Sanctuaries of Canada are located in British Columbia:

- Christie Islet
- Esquimalt Lagoon
- George C. Reifel
- Nechako River
- Shoal Harbour
- Vaseux Lake
- Victoria Harbour

=== Fisheries and Oceans Canada ===
Three Marine Protected Areas of Canada are located in British Columbia:

- Endeavour Hydrothermal Vents
- Hecate Strait and Queen Charlotte Sound Glass Sponge Reefs
- SGaan Kinghlas-Bowie Seamount

Three Marine Refuges of Canada are located in British Columbia:

- Gwaxdlala/Nalaxdlala (Lull/Hoeya)
- Offshore Pacific Seamounts and Vents
- Strait of Georgia and Howe Sound Glass Sponge Reef

== Provincially protected areas ==
=== Ministry of Forests, Lands, Natural Resource Operations and Rural Development ===
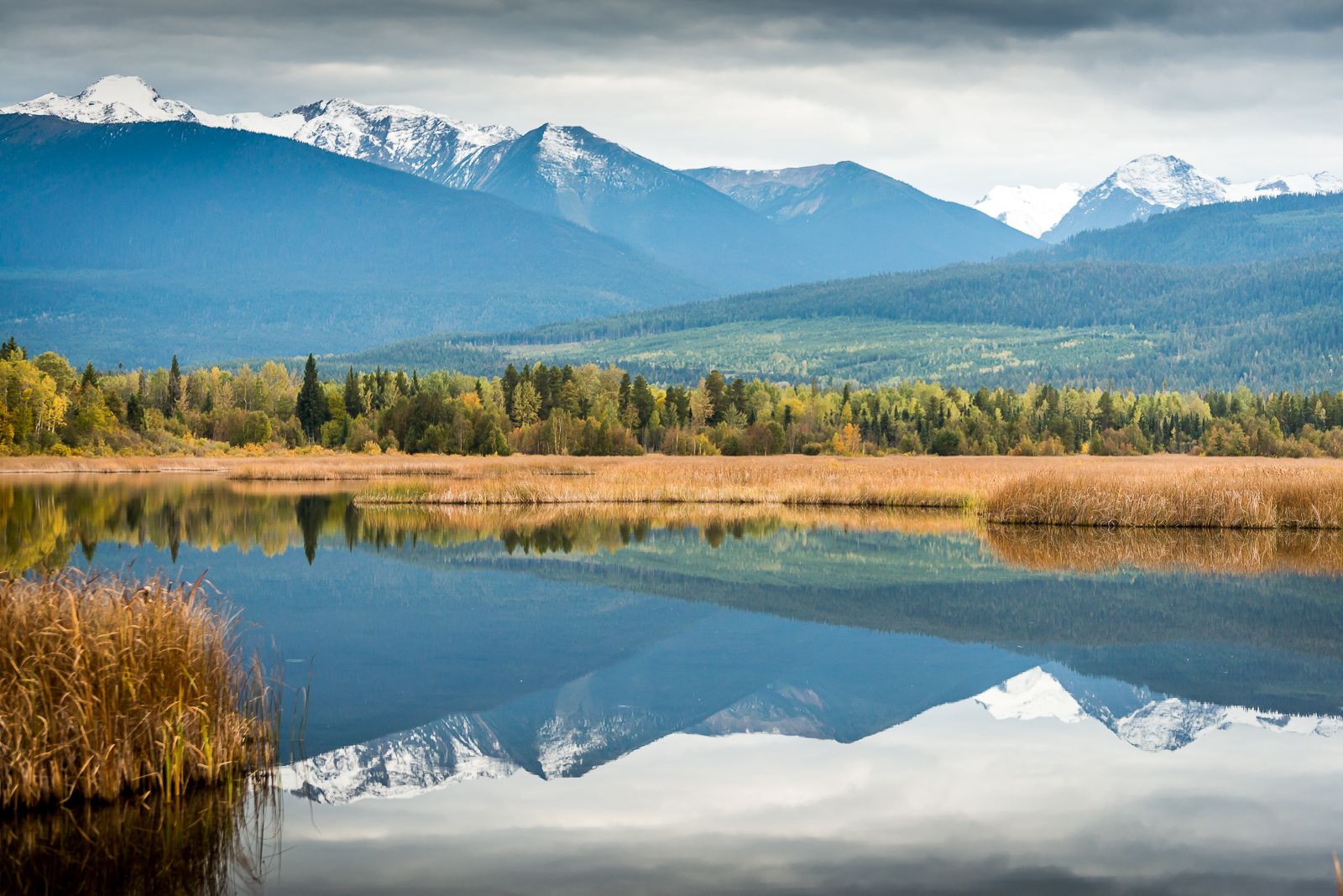
Cranberry Marsh/Starratt WMA, located just south of Valemount

The British Columbia Ministry of Forests, Lands, Natural Resource Operations and Rural Development (FLNRORD) manages a system of 31 Wildlife Management Areas throughout the province:

- Bert Brink
- Boundary Bay
- Chilanko Marsh
- Cluxewe
- Columbia Wetlands
- Coquitlam River
- Cranberry Marsh/Starratt
- Dewdrop-Rosseau Creek
- East Side Columbia Lake
- Green Mountain
- Great Bear Rainforest
- Hamling Lakes
- Lhá:lt/Harrison-Chehalis
- Lazo Marsh-North East Comox
- McTaggart-Cowan/Nsək'łniw't
- Midge Creek
- Parksville-Qualicum Beach
- Pemberton Wetlands
- Pitt-Addington Marsh
- Quatse Estuary
- Roberts Bank
- S'amunu
- Serpentine
- Skwelwil'em Squamish Estuary
- South Arm Marshes
- South Okanagan
- Stellako River
- Sturgeon Bank
- Swan Lake
- Todagin
- Tofino Mudflats
- Tranquille

== See also ==
- List of municipal and regional parks in British Columbia
