= Serpentine Wildlife Management Area =

Wildlife Management Area in British Columbia, Canada

- IUCN category IV (habitat/species management area)
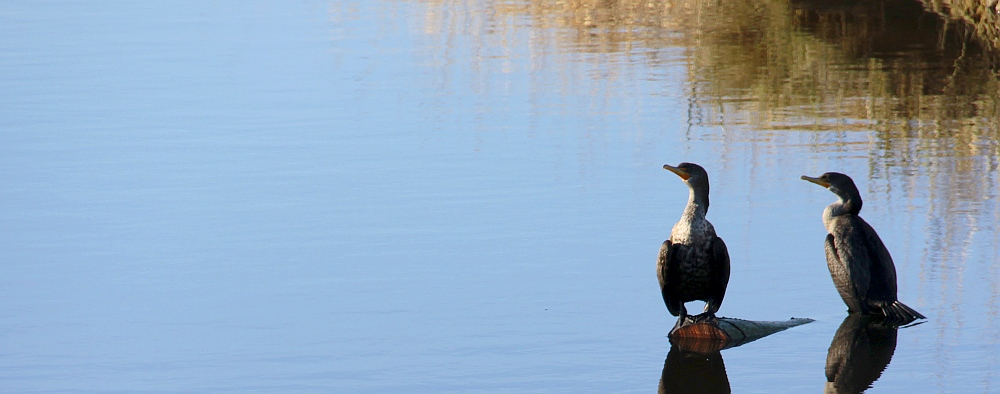
- A pair of cormorants in fen the Serpentine River, British Columbia

- Location within British Columbia Location within Greater Vancouver Regional District
- Location: Surrey, British Columbia, Canada
- Coordinates: 49°05′08″N 122°49′12″W
- Area: 71 ha (180 acres)
- Designation: Wildlife Management Area
- Established: 12 April 2009
- Governing body: FLNRORD

The Serpentine Wildlife Management Area is a small wildlife management area located on the south coast of British Columbia in Surrey. It contains many kilometers of walking trail and viewing towers to enjoy the nature and observe the many species found in the area. Although the boundaries have changed over the years, the Government of British Columbia still manages the land to ensure it meets the currents goals that were set in place to protect the local and endangered species that inhabit the area as well as monitoring the effects of climate change. This is done in partnership with Ducks Unlimited Canada, although the land falls within the territories of the Semiahmoo and Tsawwassen First Nation.

== Geography ==
The wildlife management area is at the mouth of the Serpentine River before it enters Mud Bay. Thus the area is highly connected to the Boundary Bay Wildlife Management Area.

=== Boundaries ===
In 1973, when the area was first designated a Wildlife area, the borders were Highway 99, King George Boulevard, and the Serpentine River. This area added up to 106 hectares of space considered a Wildlife area, all found in Surrey, BC. Since then, the boundaries have changed. The Ministry of Transportation and Highways currently owns the property south of 44th Avenue, which has since been called the Serpentine Annex. This southern portion does not feature any trails, viewing towers, or other amenities featured in the Serpentine Wildlife Management Area and is only differentiated by the differing ownership and management. Nowadays, 44th avenue acts as the southern boundary to the Serpentine Wildlife Management Area. The boundaries were set with the creation of the adjacent highways and other natural borders in the area. This does not include privately owned land such as Art Knapps. The total area is now 71.3 hectares.

== Goals ==
There are four main goals that are currently being monitored within the Serpentine Wildlife Management Area. The first is to manage the wildlife species and habitats, mainly including birds and fish. The second and third are regarding maintaining a public recreation area that does not disturb the general wildlife, as well as keeping public health and safety a top priority. The final goal is to make sure that the management plan is up to date while taking into account current Regional Stewardship objectives.

These goals are all currently being monitored and are so far being well met. Any invasive species in the area are being managed, the wildlife habitat is being maintained and species that have been introduced or reintroduced are currently self-sustaining. There is a plan regarding the persistence of fish in the area that has also been actively monitored. Wildlife disturbances, such as littering, have diminished while public support of limiting human activities in the area is generally improving. Local vegetation has been maintained and the area is clean which all adds up to an environment which is safe for public access. Lastly, current management needs including the present state of the land is all accounted for in the management plan. This means the needs of the local First Nations, Government, stakeholders and public are all adequately reflected, which falls in line with the Stewardship objectives.

=== Indigenous involvement in conservation ===
The Serpentine Wildlife Management Area is located on Coast Salish land in Southwestern British Columbia. The area is not located on a specific reserve but is located nearby the Semiahmoo First Nation Reserve in White Rock, British Columbia. However, the area is located on the historical territory of the Semiahmoo First Nation and is additionally in a boundary area between the Semiahmoo and the Tsawwassen First Nation. There is no information available on if the Government of British Columbia or the partner management company, Ducks Unlimited Canada, have worked with the Semiahmoo on the conservation and management of the Serpentine Wildlife Management Area.

Ducks Unlimited Canada is the partner management and conservation company with the Government of British Columbia. They actively support Indigenous-led conservation planning across Canada. This company creates wetland maps that are woven together using datasets that create large-scale, detailed maps of marsh, fen, bog, swamp and water. Additionally, they use helicopter-based field sites that are used to train and test machine-learning models to understand what is in the conservation area. This information is used in collaboration with Indigenous voices from the Semiahmoo First Nation to create conservation plans.

== Species ==
The Serpentine Wildlife Management Area (WMA) is a combination of agricultural lands and wetlands. The area consists of freshwater and saltwater but is primarily made up of freshwater marsh, specific vegetation plantings, hedgerows, and old fields. The Serpentine WMA is inhabited by a wide variety of species, including mammal, bird, fish, reptile, and amphibian species. Based on the Government of BC's Serpentine Wildlife Management Area website, some of the mammal species found in Serpentine WMA are beavers, muskrats, river otters, mink, short-tailed weasel, eastern cottontail rabbit, and Townsend's vole. Coyotes are also included in the many mammal species found in the area. Some fish species listed by Ducks Unlimited Canada are catfish, shiners, Coho salmon, rainbow trout, steelhead, and carp. The area has an overwhelming number of bird species. As shown in Avibase-The World Bird Database, the last modified 2023 data on the number of bird species found in the Serpentine WMA is 212. Waterfowl are part of the many bird species, and they specifically rely on the Serpentine WMA for migration and overwintering.

=== Endemic species ===
No known species are endemic to the Serpentine Wildlife Management Area (WMA); however, according to Ducks Unlimited Canada, the site is a crucial spot for waterfowls such as Canada geese, mallard, wigeon, coot, pintail. Water birds, shorebirds, and coastal birds rely heavily on the Serpentine WMA. The area is an important habitat for some species at risk, such as great blue heron, a blue-listed species. The Serpentine WMA is Canada's most densely populated wintering and migrating areas, a habitat extensively used by many bird species, including species at risk.

=== Species at risk ===
The Serpentine Wildlife Management Area, also better known as the Serpentine Fen is part of the most productive bird habitats in Western Canada. It was first designated as Management area back in 1973 for the purpose of raising Canada geese. It is a protected area within the boundaries of the Fraser River Estuary, so most information on species at risk focuses on the region as a whole. Most Bird populations that rely on the area are migratory; information about population trends covers various locations as the region is a UN "Wetland of Importance" or Ramsar site. The Ramsar designation for the Fraser River Delta covers six key locations Burns Bog, Sturgeon Bank, South Arm Marshes, Boundary Bay Wildlife Management Area, Serpentine, and the Alaksen National Wildlife Area (no longer considered a Ramsar site). According to their website, the designation is due to its international importance as a "stopover" area, giving roughly 250,000 migrating and wintering waterfowl and 1 million shorebirds the necessary feeding and roosting sites they need.

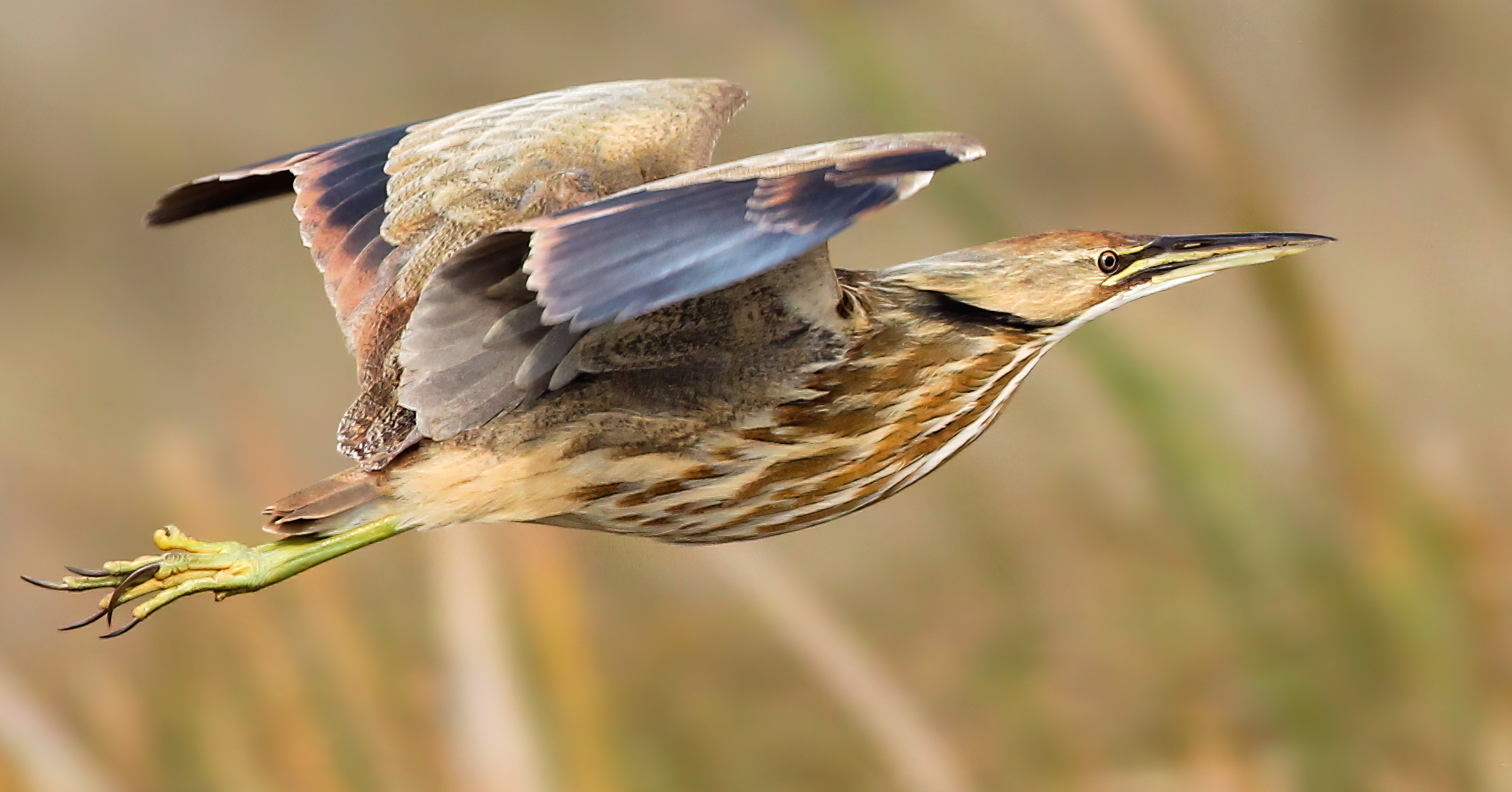
American bittern

The American bittern, for instance, is noted as a species of concern as they are vulnerable to human-caused disturbances, hence why they are on the Blue List in British Columbia. This location is vital for many migratory bird species at risk like the American Bittern and the Western Sandpiper, due to the biofilm found in the mudflats.

Biofilm found in intertidal sediments is an essential food for birds and invertebrates, and due to climate-change is becoming a scarce commodity. Shorebird populations trends are lower when the Fraser River is high, due to variability in biofilm quantity when salinity during the spring freshet is altered.

== Impact of climate change ==
Sea levels rising, high tides, and extreme weather, like heavy rainfall, have been leaving a global impact, and the Serpentine Wildlife Management Area (WMA) is also facing the effects. The result of climate change puts the land areas at risk of flooding. To combat this issue, the Serpentine WMA uses the dyke system to help regulate the water levels, which is an installment of walls or barriers that prevent water from flooding over and causing damage. As climate change impacts stay constant, detrimental flooding will increase, and the dyke system will not be a permanent fix.

According to the NOAA, issues such as coastal squeeze caused by the artificial walls put up, like the dyke system, will lead to the loss of wetlands. Another issue of channel modifications, like the dyke system that causes changes to the water flow, is the negative influence on species’ food supply and quality. The notable abovementioned variabilities lead to significant impacts such as habitat loss. As Serpentine WMA is one of the vital migration habitats for many species, the various issues relating to climate change will impact species survival and possibly species loss. The issues presented by climate change affect not only the Serpentine WMA but also the whole Fraser River Delta Ramsar site, which the Serpentine WMA is part of.

== Amenities ==
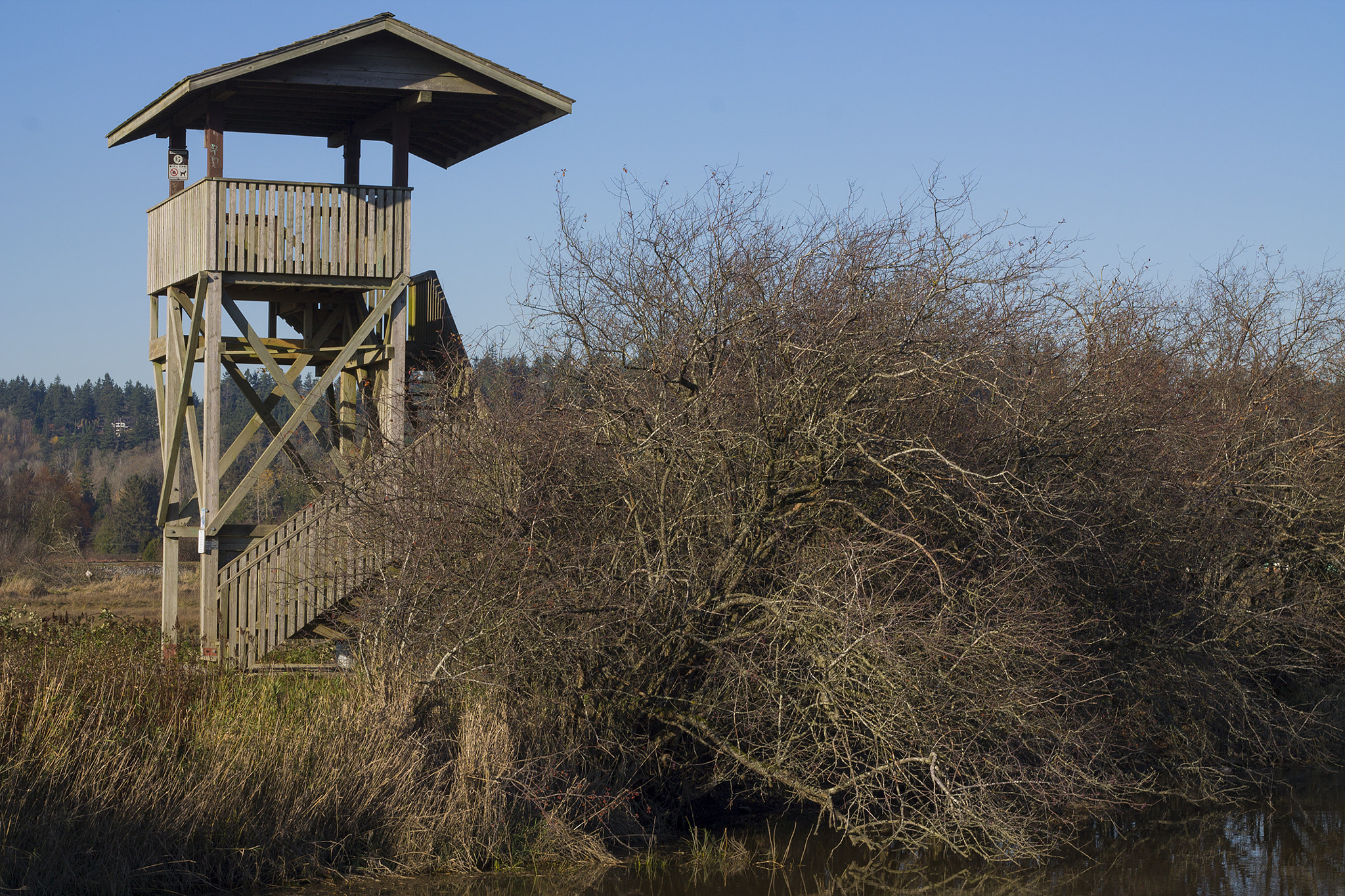
One of three lookout towers over the Serpentine Wildlife Management Area.

Its proximity to main urban areas such as White Rock, Ladner, and Surrey combined with the convenience of being between Highway 99 and King George Highway (99A). However, due to the high number of traffic in the area, no data on visitors is publicly available. The Serpentine Wildlife Management area has a 3.5 km (2.2 mi) long level trail that loops around its circumference, roughly taking 1.5 hours to walk, and is open year-round. The trail is mainly gravel and narrow in areas, contains three viewing towers, allows for fishing (with basic non-tidal licence if 16 or older) and is dog-friendly.

The narrow nature of the trail makes it difficult for wheelchair users and strollers, with none of the three viewing towers being wheelchair accessible. The trails are most popular for their birdwatching, views of the dikes, flatlands, bridges and of the surrounding farmlands.
