= Delta Heritage Air Park =

Delta Heritage Airpark
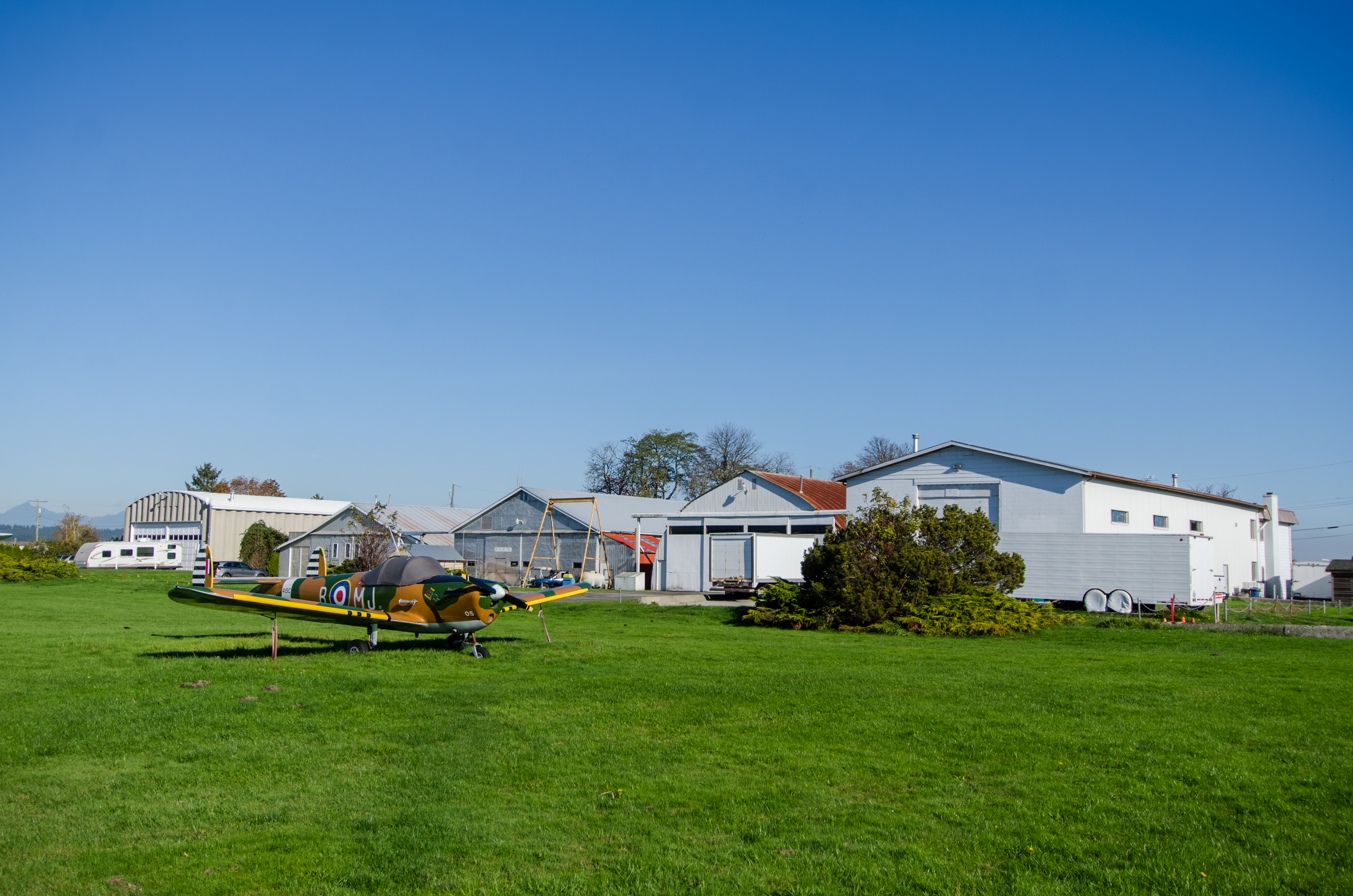
- Delta Heritage Air Park in 2017.
- IATA: none; ICAO: none; TC LID: CAK3

Summary
- Airport type: Private
- Owner: Metro Vancouver
- Operator: Recreational Aircraft Association, Chapter 85 (Delta Heritage Airpark Operating Committee, DAPCOM)
- Location: Delta, British Columbia
- Time zone: PST (UTC−08:00)
  - Summer (DST): PDT (UTC−07:00)
- Elevation AMSL: 10 ft / 3 m
- Coordinates: 49°04′43″N 122°56′17″W
- Website: www.deltaheritageairpark.org

Map
- Location in British Columbia CAK3 (Canada)

Runways
Direction	Length		Surface
Direction	ft	m	Surface
07/25	2,600	792	Grass
- Sources: Canada Flight Supplement

Delta Heritage Air Park (TC LID: CAK3) is a private aerodrome located 4.5 nautical miles (8.3 km; 5.2 mi) east of Delta, British Columbia, Canada. Several flying clubs are headquartered at the park, including branches of COPA and RAA.

The park is located within Boundary Bay park and borders the Boundary Bay Wildlife Management Area.

== History ==
The air park was established in the early 1960s and by the 1970s it housed about 120 aircraft. The 85th chapter of the Recreational Aircraft Association of Canada (RAA 85) constructed an aircraft hangar and clubhouse on the site in the 1970s.

In 1995 the park was acquired by Metro Vancouver who planned on turning the land into a park. An agreement was reached between Metro Vancouver and RAA 85 to allow flying to continue within the air park.

As of 2020, about 60 aircraft were stationed at the park including many antiques.

The park hosts an annual fly-in.

== See also ==
- List of airports in the Lower Mainland
