= Westham Island Bridge =

Bridge in Delta, British Columbia, Canada

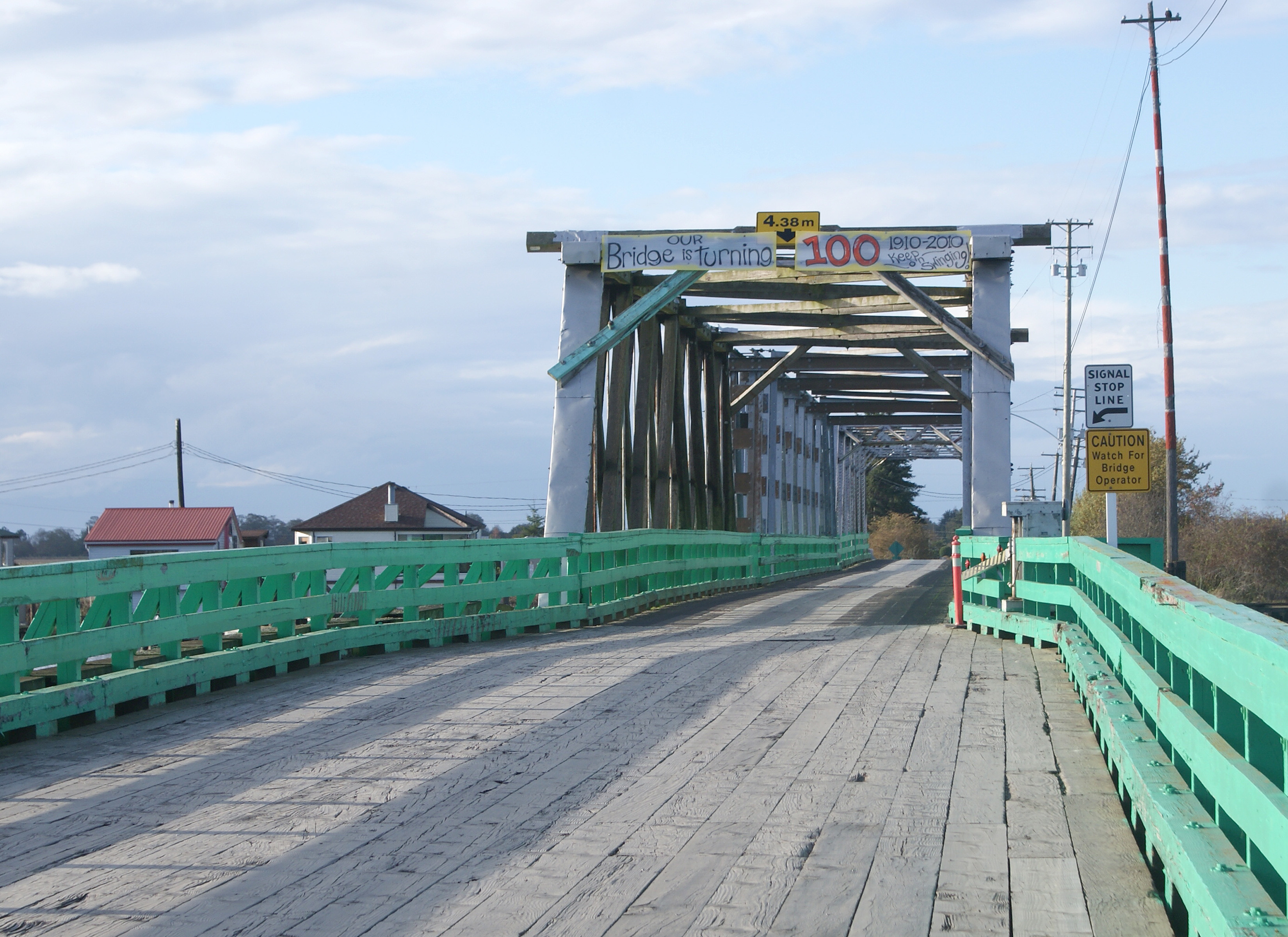
- Westham Island Bridge, looking northward.
- Coordinates: 49°04′50″N 123°07′44″W
- Carries: Westham Island Road
- Crosses: Canoe Pass
- Locale: Delta, British Columbia
- Owner: TransLink
- Maintained by: Mainroads Contracting

Characteristics
- Total length: 325 m
- Height: 4.38 m

History
- Opened: December 1909

Location
- Interactive map of Westham Island Bridge

The Westham Island Bridge, which is a single-lane, wood-deck truss bridge over Canoe Pass near the mouth of the Fraser River, connects Westham Island with the Delta mainland, in Metro Vancouver.

== Original ferry ==
In 1882, the British Union (BU) and the British American (BA) canneries opened at Canoe Pass. Sufficient school age children existed to justify the erection of a schoolhouse and opening of a school in the 1883/84 year. Largely catering to non-resident cannery workers, Paul Swenson operated a ferry for 15 years, but received no government subsidy. The precise period is unclear, but the mid-1880s to early 1900s seems most likely. The BA operated a ferry during the following years. However, island farmers made other shipping arrangements, because the ferry did not transport livestock.

== Original bridge ==
The reopening of the school for the 1909 year indicates a reversal of a dip in student numbers, probably reflecting an increase in the island general population. This may have been a factor in choosing the bridge over ferry option. The design comprised three 19-metre (63 ft) king trusses, a 31-metre (103 ft) howe truss, a 37-metre (123 ft) howe truss, and a 43-metre (140 ft) steel swing span. The bridge opened to traffic in December 1909, but the official opening was March 1910. Efforts to prevent scouring ultimately proved unsuccessful. By 1922, the structure was condemned as unstable, and a ferry was temporarily reintroduced.

Beyond the ongoing maintenance, the first major rebuild was in 1924/25, when a 30-metre (100 ft) and a 37-metre (120 ft) howe truss and three piers were replaced. Two of the piers comprised a cluster of 75 34-metre (110 ft) wooden piles. Pile trestle and steel I-beams replaced three king trusses in 1937/38.

The bridge tender (operator) received a new cabin and housing improvements in 1942/43. A temporary ferry service operated from March 1951, while the whole bridge was rebuilt except for the steel swing span.

In August 1969, a tug pulling a barge took out a 49-metre (160 ft) howe truss. A barge ferry provided service until a bailey bridge was floated into place five days later. In 1971/72, a Callender-Hamilton steel span with timber decking replaced the bailey bridge.

In the late 1990s, a wooden fence was added along both sides of the bridge.

Major rehabilitation in 2019 required brief closures. Only one superstructure span continues to be of wood construction, although its beams have been replaced over the years. The planks forming the decking for the whole bridge have been replaced on a regular basis. The 325-metre (1,066 ft) structure has undergone extensive refitting and alterations over the years.

== Operation ==
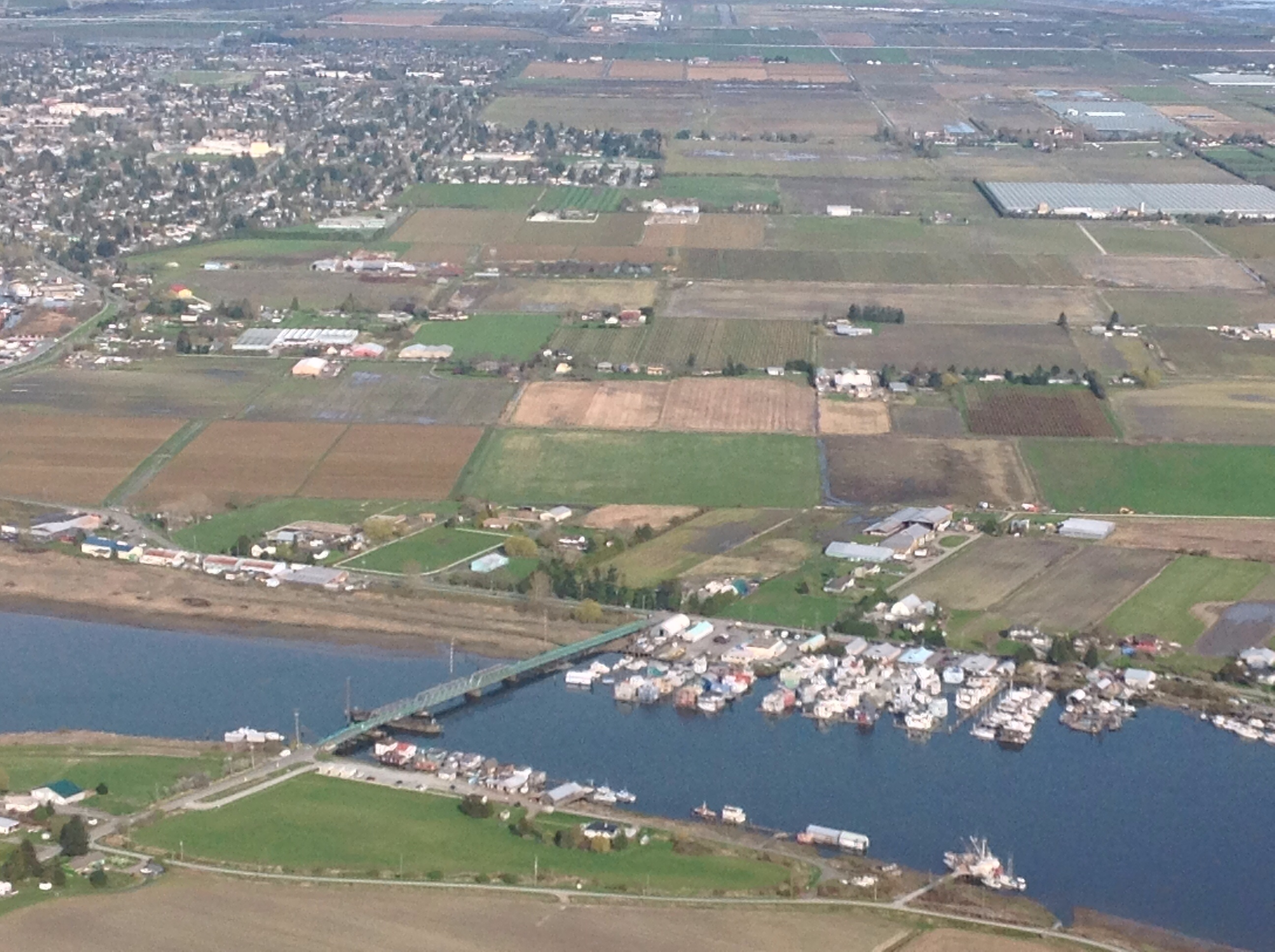
Eastward aerial view, Westham Island Bridge, 2014

TransLink, the regional transportation authority, has owned the bridge since 1999. A contractor maintains and operates the crossing. The load limit is 50 tons on TransLink's oldest and narrowest bridge, and one of few containing wood components in Metro Vancouver. The swing span is opened about seven or eight times a day to allow the passage mainly of fishing boats but also some pleasure craft. Mainroads Contracting, the franchise holder, operates the span. Marine traffic must call the bridge operator 40 minutes in advance on VHF channel 74.

The bridge was manually swivelled by lifting a steel plate in the deck of the bridge and inserting a 3 m (10 ft) bar into a capstan, and slowly walking around it to open or close the span. The longest tender, who remained 31 years, had lost an arm in World War I. Although the bridge still has this manual capacity, an electric motor has superseded this function.

On January 20, 2026, the tugboat Quadrant Partner collided with the bridge. The bridge was closed to vehicles temporarily to assess for damages, although pedestrian access was maintained. A temporary barge service was instituted by the city of Delta to provide vehicular access to local residents and farms. The bridge was re-opened on March 28, 2026.

== Importance ==
The bridge, which is the only land connection between Westham Island and the Delta mainland, provides access to the agricultural enterprises and the George C. Reifel Migratory Bird Sanctuary.

The iconic structure is an occasional site location for film and TV productions. One of the memorable ones was an episode of the X-Files TV series, "Kill Switch".

== See also ==
- List of crossings of the Fraser River
- List of BC bridges
