= First Person Shooter (The X-Files) =

- The X-Files episode
- Episode no.: Season 7 Episode 13
- Directed by: Chris Carter
- Written by: William Gibson; Tom Maddox
- Production code: 7ABX13
- Original air date: February 27, 2000
- Running time: 44 minutes

Guest appearances
- Krista Allen as Maitreya/Jade Blue Afterglow; Jamie Marsh as Ivan Martinez; Constance Zimmer as Phoebe; Billy Ray Gallion as Retro; Tom Braidwood as Melvin Frohike; Dean Haglund as Richard Langly; Bruce Harwood as John Fitzgerald Byers; Michael Ray Bower as Lo-Fat; Ryan Todd as Moxie; James Geralden as Detective Lacoeur; John Marrott as Security Guard; Christopher Ng as Darryl Musashi

Episode chronology
← Previous "X-Cops"	Next → "Theef"
- The X-Files season 7

"First Person Shooter" is the thirteenth episode of the seventh season of the science fiction television series The X-Files. It premiered on the Fox network in the United States on February 27, 2000. The episode is a "Monster-of-the-Week" story, unconnected to the series' wider mythology. "First Person Shooter" was watched by 15.31 million people in its initial broadcast, with a 9.3 Nielsen household rating. The episode received mostly negative reviews from critics.

The show centers on FBI special agents Fox Mulder (David Duchovny) and Dana Scully (Gillian Anderson) who work on cases linked to the paranormal, called X-Files. Mulder is a believer in the paranormal, while the skeptical Scully has been assigned to debunk his work. In this episode, The Lone Gunmen summon Mulder and Scully to the headquarters of a video game design company after a new virtual reality game, which the Gunmen helped design, is taken over by a bizarre female computer character whose power is much more than virtual.

"First Person Shooter" was written by noted authors William Gibson and Tom Maddox, and directed by series creator Chris Carter. In addition, the episode serves as the spiritual successor to Gibson and Maddox's earlier episode "Kill Switch." Gibson was motivated to write the episode after the success of "Kill Switch." The episode featured several elaborate special effects sequences that nearly put the episode over budget.

== Plot ==
Three men equipped with futuristic combat gear and automatic weapons enter the virtual reality game First Person Shooter. One reaches the second level, where he encounters a female character named Maitreya. After declaring, "This is my game," she kills the player with a gun. Thereafter, Agents Fox Mulder (David Duchovny) and Dana Scully (Gillian Anderson) are called in to investigate.

The agents visit the game's developers in Inland Empire, California, where The Lone Gunmen work as consultants. The dead player has an actual gunshot wound, though programmer Ivan insists no real weapon could have entered the secure building. The agents then view footage of Maitreya, whom Mulder suspects is the killer. Computer hacker Darryl Musashi enters the game to kill Maitreya, but she beheads him with a sword. Meanwhile, police find a woman resembling Maitreya, who is a stripper named Jade Blue Afterglow. When questioned, she tells the agents that a medical imaging facility paid her to scan her body.

When the Lone Gunmen become trapped inside First Person Shooter, Mulder enters the game to help them. Programmer Phoebe admits to Scully that she created Maitreya as a personal estrogenic outlet in an otherwise testosterone-fueled environment. Although intended for Phoebe's separate project, Maitreya found her way into the First Person Shooter. Scully joins Mulder, and the two battle Maitreya. When Maitreya attacks them with a virtual tank, Phoebe gives the command kill. This results in the game being destroyed and the agents being saved. Later, Ivan discovers that one monitor remains active, displaying Maitreya's avatar with Scully's face.

== Production ==
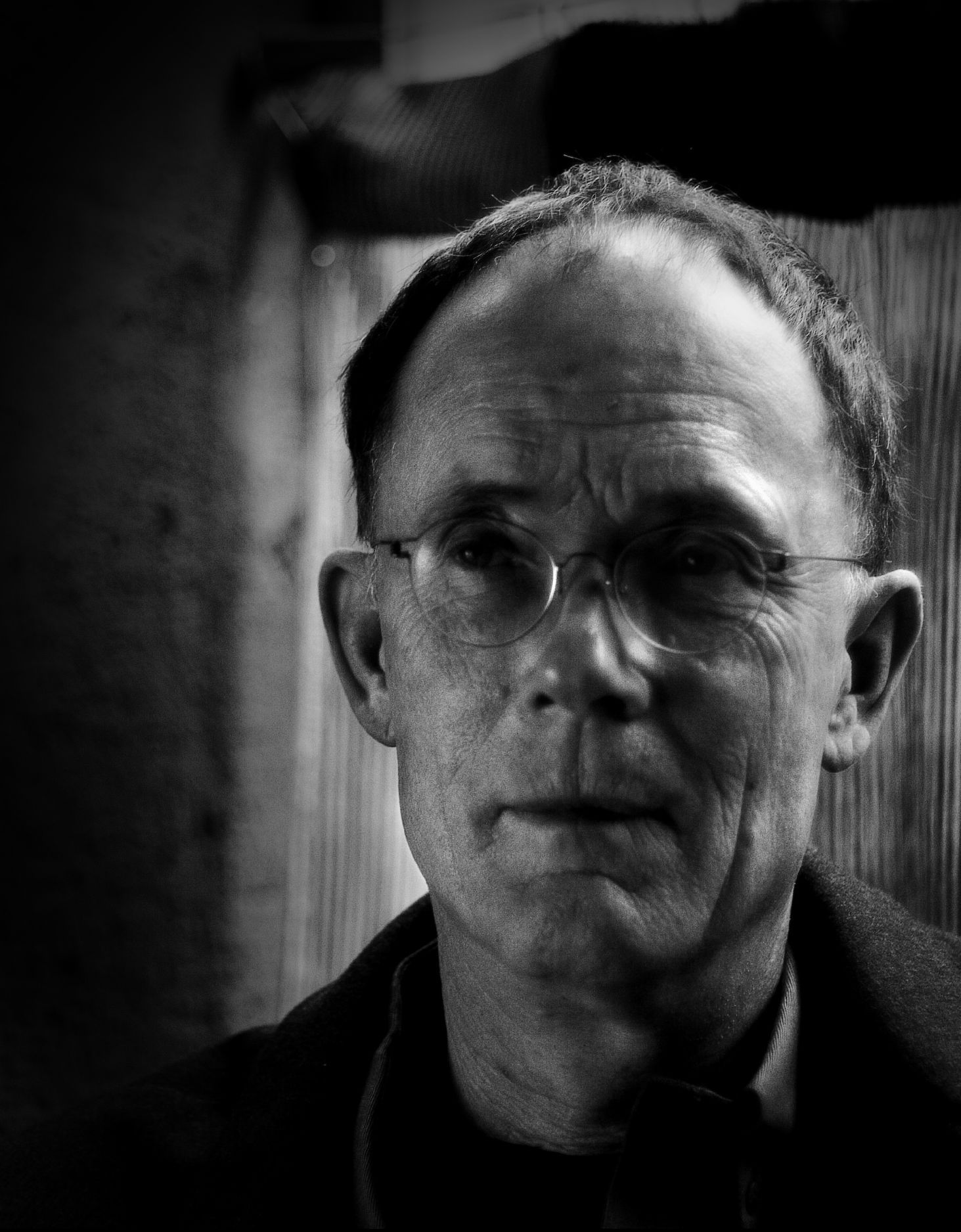
The episode was co-written by noted author William Gibson.

=== Background and writing ===
The episode was written by William Gibson and his fellow science fiction novelist and long-time friend Tom Maddox. "First Person Shooter" was the second X-Files episode written by the two, after the season five's "Kill Switch"; the episode had first aired on February 15, 1998, and was rerun often, which encouraged Gibson to continue working in television. According to executive producer Frank Spotnitz, the writing process for "First Person Shooter" was slow. Initially, Gibson and Maddox presented the first two acts of their idea, which were tweaked by series creator Chris Carter and Spotnitz in order to make the story feel more like an X-File. After the rewriting process, the writers then returned with the final two acts. Because both Gibson and Maddox enjoyed The Lone Gunmen as characters, they wrote "First Person Shooter" to prominently feature them.

=== Filming and casting ===
The ideas in the episode's script proved difficult to transfer onto film. Spotnitz later explained that, "William Gibson and Tom Maddox always get us into trouble. They always come up with these great ideas that are always hard to execute." This was exacerbated by budgetary challenges, as the many special effects in the episode almost caused the project to go over budget. To keep costs down, the production crew initially borrowed virtual game layouts from video game companies. However, not wishing to simply "copy existing designs," production designer Corey Kaplan and his design team created layouts of their own, which ended up being costly. The S.E. Rykoff distribution center in Los Angeles served as the setting for the episode's opening sequence. At the time, the company's owner was the uncle of X-Files producer Paul Rabwin. A warehouse in downtown Los Angeles was used as the backdrop of the opening scene.

Carter later noted that the hardest part of "First Person Shooter" was casting a suitable actress to play Maitreya. Casting director Rick Millikan looked into every possible avenue—including: "strippers, adult video entertainment ladies, [and] erotic thriller/direct-to-video type actresses"—before settling upon Krista Allen. Initially, she possessed a "wholesome quality" that bothered Carter, but as the episode was being filmed, both Carter and Millikan recognized that Allen was right for the part. "First Person Shooter" also required the use of several stuntmen, most notably for Mulder and Maitreya. Dana Heath, a professional gymnast, was hired for several scenes that required Maitreya to execute a series of handstands. Fourteen stuntmen were also hired to ride Kawasaki motorcycles and fire gas-powered machine-guns.

=== Action and effects ===
Bruce Harwood, who portrayed Byers, noted that the action sequences in the episode were a challenge. He explained, "It's pretty difficult on a set when the stuntmen come up to you and go, 'Don't worry, you'll be safe, Nothing to worry about. Okay. Everyone put their safety glasses on.'" The tank scene was created entirely with CGI technology. The only actual footage from the scene was the background. A computer-generated tank, along with a woman, were designed on a computer. Then, special effects shots of smoke and explosions were layered on top of the vehicle to give it a more life-like appearance.

== Broadcast and reception ==
"First Person Shooter" first aired in the United States on February 27, 2000. This episode earned a Nielsen rating of 9.3, with a 13 share, meaning that roughly 9.3 percent of all television-equipped households, and 13 percent of households watching television, were tuned in to the episode. It was viewed by 15.31 million viewers. The episode aired in the United Kingdom and Ireland on Sky1 on June 11, 2000, and received 0.67 million viewers, making it the third most watched episode that week.

Emily St. James of The A.V. Club awarded the episode a "D−" and largely panned it, calling it "legendarily bad". She argued that "First Person Shooter" felt "as if the show is slowly but surely letting the air out of its own tires." She was, however, moderately pleased with the performances of Duchovny and Anderson, writing that they both were "really trying". Kenneth Silber from Space.com criticized the lack of emotion in the episode, writing, "'First Person Shooter' achieves considerable mayhem but remarkably little drama. There seems little reason to care what happens to any of the characters, whether virtual or real, regulars or guests. Even as a man's hands are cut into bloody stumps, one never gets the sense that anything important is going on."

Rich Rosell from Digitally Obsessed awarded the episode 2.5 out of 5 stars and wrote that "this Chris Carter-directed ep [sic] oddly enough doesn't center on the series mythology arc, but instead opts for a stab at the tired ol' virtual reality genre. [...] The only saving grace here is the appearance of hip conspiracy buffs The Lone Gunmen, who always brighten up any episode they appeared in." Cyriaque Lamar from i09 called Maitreya one of "The 10 Most Ridiculous X-Files Monsters". Lamar derided the plot, calling it "Scully and Mulder Do Doom", and expressed surprise that the episode was written by William Gibson. Robert Shearman, in his book Wanting to Believe: A Critical Guide to The X-Files, Millennium & The Lone Gunmen, rated the episode one star out of five. Regardless of the negative press, "First Person Shooter" became one of Gillian Anderson's favorite episodes, despite "its reliance on big guns and raging testosterone." Anderson explained that she enjoyed the opportunity "to show Scully wearing heavy metal and firing oversized weapons."

Although "First Person Shooter" was not as well-received as the first episode written by William Gibson and Tom Maddox, "Kill Switch", the episode later won Emmy Awards for Outstanding Sound Mixing for a Drama Series and Outstanding Visual Effects for a Series, and received a nomination for Outstanding Sound Editing for a Series.

== Bibliography ==
- Hurwitz, Matt; Knowles, Chris (2008). The Complete X-Files. Insight Editions. ISBN 978-1-933784-80-9.
- Shapiro, Marc (2000). All Things: The Official Guide to the X-Files Volume 6. Harper Prism. ISBN 0-06-107611-2.
- Shearman, Robert (2009). Wanting to Believe: A Critical Guide to The X-Files, Millennium & The Lone Gunmen. Mad Norwegian Press. ISBN 978-0-9759446-9-1.
