= Kill Switch (The X-Files) =

- The X-Files episode
- A virtual Dana Scully attacks a nurse in Fox Mulder's AI-controlled reverie.
- Episode no.: Season 5 Episode 11
- Directed by: Rob Bowman
- Written by: William Gibson; Tom Maddox
- Production code: 5X11
- Original air date: February 15, 1998
- Running time: 45 minutes

Guest appearances
- Bruce Harwood as John Fitzgerald Byers; Dean Haglund as Richard Langly; Tom Braidwood as Melvin Frohike; Patrick Keating as Donald Gelman; Peter Williams as Jackson; Rob Daprocida as Bunny; Jerry Schram as Gerald Boyce; Dan Weber as Charles Figgis; Kristin Lehman as Esther Nairn; Kate Luyben as Nurse Nancy; Stephen Collins as Cyril Pollard; Steve Griffith as Paramedic; Ted Cole as 2nd Paramedic

Episode chronology
← Previous "Chinga"	Next → "Bad Blood"
- The X-Files season 5

"Kill Switch" is the eleventh episode of the fifth season of the science fiction television series The X-Files. It premiered in the United States on the Fox network on February 15, 1998. It was written by William Gibson and Tom Maddox and directed by Rob Bowman. The episode is a "Monster-of-the-Week" story, unconnected to the series' wider mythology. "Kill Switch" earned a Nielsen household rating of 11.1, being watched by 18.04 million people in its initial broadcast. The episode received mostly positive reviews from television critics, with several complimenting Fox Mulder's virtual experience. The episode's name has also been said to inspire the name for the American metalcore band Killswitch Engage.

In this episode, Mulder and Scully become targets of a rogue AI capable of the worst kind of torture while investigating the strange circumstances of the death of a reclusive computer genius rumored to have been researching artificial intelligence.

"Kill Switch" was co-written by cyberpunk pioneers William Gibson and Tom Maddox. The two eventually wrote another episode for the show: season seven's "First Person Shooter". "Kill Switch" was written after Gibson and Maddox approached the series, offering to write an episode. Reminiscent of the "dark visions" of filmmaker David Cronenberg, the episode contained "many obvious pokes and prods at high-end academic cyberculture." In addition, "Kill Switch" contained several scenes featuring elaborate explosives and digital effects, including one wherein a computer-animated Scully fights nurses in a virtual hospital. "Kill Switch" deals with various "Gibsonian" themes, including alienation, paranoia, artificial intelligence, and transferring one's consciousness into cyberspace, among others.

== Plot ==
At a diner in Washington, D.C., a man tries to access files over the internet with a laptop computer, but is repeatedly denied. Meanwhile, several drug dealers receive anonymous phone calls about the whereabouts of their competitors; they are told that they are at the same diner. Two U.S. Marshals receive a similar phone call about an escaped prisoner. The drug dealers arrive in pairs as the man attempts to gain access to the files. Just as he does, the two Marshals appear and a shootout ensues.

Fox Mulder (David Duchovny) and Dana Scully (Gillian Anderson) arrive and identify the bodies of the drug dealers. Mulder also identifies the man with the laptop as Donald Gelman, "a Silicon Valley folk hero" who aspired to create an artificial intelligence. Mulder takes Gelman's laptop and finds a CD inside. When he puts it into the car stereo, it plays "Twilight Time" by The Platters while making the car's lighting blink to the rhythm. However, the agents take it to the Lone Gunmen, who discover that the disc contains a large quantity of encrypted data. The trio, however, are unable to decrypt it. Upon Scully's suggestion, they access Gelman's e-mail account and find a message sent by someone named Invisigoth, saying that someone named David is missing.

The message contains a BIC code for an intermodal shipping container, which Mulder and Scully locate. When they approach it, a woman uses a electroshock weapon on the agents and attempts to flee but is captured by Scully. The container turns out to be full of state-of-the-art computer equipment. The woman, the "Invisigoth" (Kristin Lehman) they've been looking for, warns the agents that a laser-armed Defense Department satellite has pinpointed their location. They quickly leave the area as the container is destroyed, supposedly by a "Particle Beam" shot from a defense satellite. The agents bring Invisigoth to meet the Lone Gunmen. Invisigoth, whose real name turns out to be Esther Nairn, tells the agents and the Lone Gunmen that Gelman succeeded in creating an artificial intelligence. She reveals that once the AI locates an enemy, it destroys them using the satellite. According to Esther, Gelman was creating "Kill Switch", a virus that could destroy the AI. However, the AI learned of Gelman's plans and killed him by luring the drug dealers and the police to the diner. The only way to destroy the AI is to find the computer on which it is stored. It turns out that David is Esther's friend, and also worked with Gelman.

Mulder uses a government source to find a secret T3 line in Fairfax County, Virginia, which the AI uses to log onto the Internet. He also finds the trailer that is connected to the T3 line. Meanwhile, Esther forces Scully to drive to David's house. However, they find that the house has been destroyed. Esther admits that she and David had been planning to transfer their consciousness into cyberspace to enter the AI. Gelman, however, thought the idea was too dangerous. Esther also admits that she and David were in love, and were having an affair behind Gelman's back. Meanwhile, Mulder finds much computer hardware inside the trailer. He also finds David's dead body, with a virtual reality helmet on his head. Suddenly, Mulder is constrained by moving cables and wires, and experiences a strange vision in which he is in a hospital where nurses threaten to amputate his limbs unless he reveals Kill Switch's location. Meanwhile, the AI locates Scully and Esther driving near a swing bridge. They become trapped on the bridge after the AI manipulates its drawing mechanism, causing Scully to persuade Esther to throw the computer into the water below. Just as it hits the water it is destroyed by the defense satellite's laser strike.

Scully and Esther find the trailer in which Mulder is trapped. Esther reveals that she still has the CD on which the Kill Switch is stored. Scully puts it into the drive into the AI, which then releases Mulder. She gets him out of the trailer, but Esther stays inside. Esther connects herself to the virtual reality system, uploading her consciousness and killing her body moments before the trailer is destroyed by the satellite weapon. Mulder tells Scully that Esther's consciousness probably joined the AI. Later, the Lone Gunmen get a message on their computer reading, "Bite me", something that Esther had said to Scully earlier. Just before the credits, a trailer is shown in North Platte, Nebraska, similar to the one where the AI lived, with automatic security cameras monitoring a boy who approaches the trailer to retrieve a football.

== Production ==
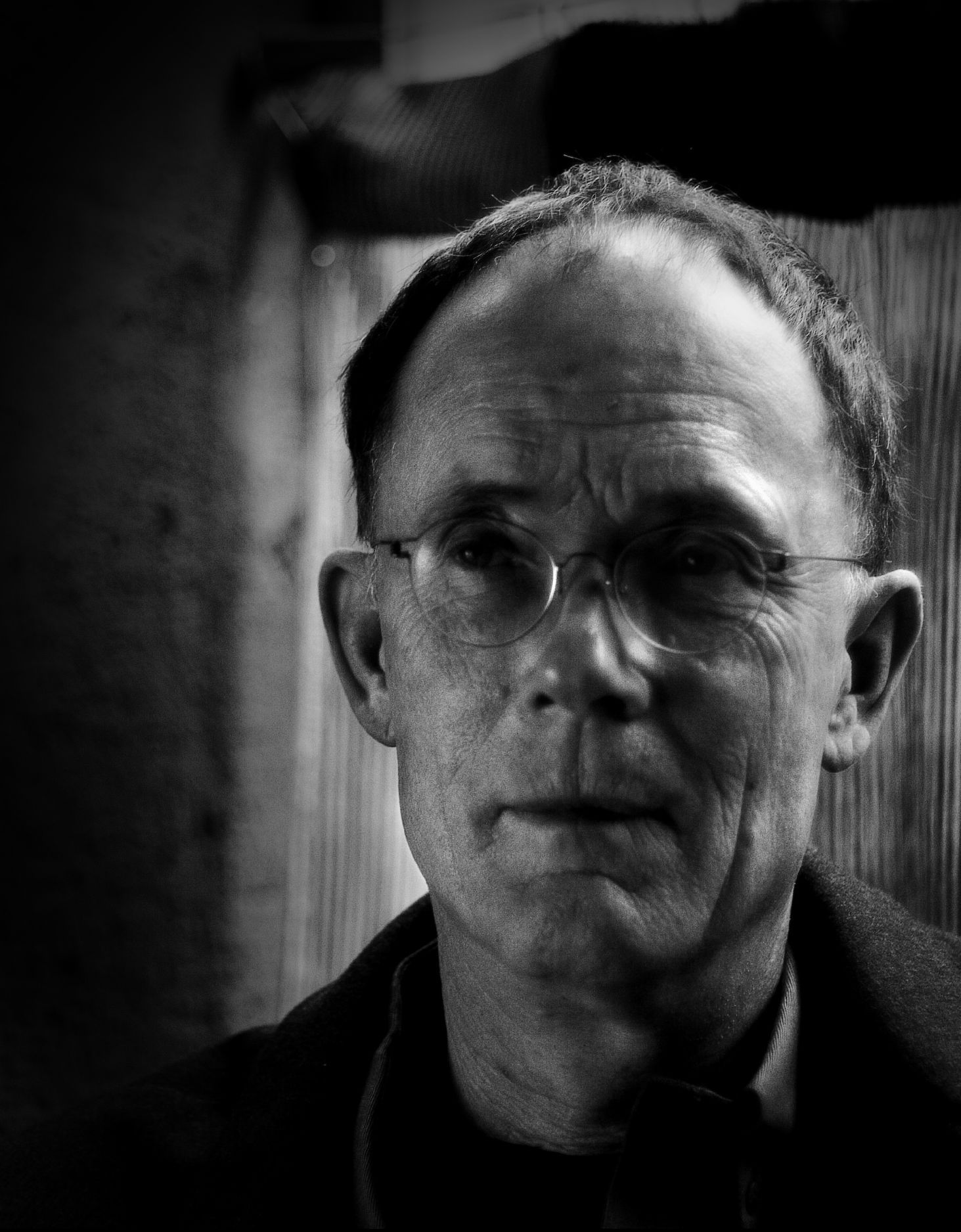
The episode was co-written by author William Gibson.

=== Writing ===
The episode was written by acclaimed cyberpunk novelist William Gibson, together with fellow science fiction author Tom Maddox. The authors and longtime friends had discussed various collaborations before and approached the production company with an offer to write an episode. Gibson originally started watching the series on the suggestion of his daughter, 15 years old at the time. (In fact, during the filming of "Kill Switch", Gibson spent a majority of his time on the set only "because [his] daughter insisted on being there.")

"Kill Switch" deals with recurrent Gibsonian themes, like "alienation, paranoia, [and] the will to survive". The Vancouver Sun author Alex Strachan later compared many of the episode's themes to that of Gibson's books, most notably in his novels Neuromancer, Mona Lisa Overdrive, and Virtual Light. Written outside the mytharc of the series as a standalone story, "Kill Switch" was penned to be reminiscent of the "dark visions" of filmmaker David Cronenberg and to contain "many obvious pokes and prods at high-end academic cyberculture." The episode also revolves around the "interaction of human and artificial intelligence ... on the World Wide Web"—ideas that were very popular when the episode was written.

Reportedly, it took over a year before the episode was re-written and completed, due to series creator Chris Carter and executive producer Frank Spotnitz's other priorities. When they were finally available, Carter and Spotnitz made some revisions to the script, including "upp[ing] the attitude on Esther's character" and tweaking the way Mulder and Scully react to her.

=== Filming and effects ===
When you're writing a novel, there's no budget ... you just make stuff up, lots of really intricate stuff happens in this scene. So the script comes and it's the biggest thing in terms of complexity, ... that I've ever looked at for X-Files.

— Rob Bowman, on the cost of the episode.

According to Spotnitz, "Kill Switch" was the most expensive episode that the show produced during its original run in Vancouver, and it took a total of 22 days to film. The episode's bridge scenes were filmed at the Westham Island Bridge, which spans Canoe Pass, British Columbia. The location had been discovered by Carter during a technical survey for the prior fifth-season episode "Schizogeny". Because the bridge was the only way to access part of the Fraser River community, filming was heavily regulated, and because of this, permission to film the scene in which Esther throws the laptop into the river required thirty days to obtain. The abandoned house that Mulder discovers was filmed at a historical landmark known locally as "Read House".

The episode contained several scenes featuring elaborate explosives, such as the one featuring a missile destroying a shipping container, which was originally scheduled to be filmed at one of Vancouver's waterfront facilities. After the city rescinded permission to film, the special effects crew for The X-Files shipped as many containers as they could to a recycling center in the adjacent city of Burnaby; here, they were able to film the explosion "without a hitch". The destruction of the trailer was filmed adjacent to the Boundary Bay Airport, and afterwards, the series received several complaints from people living nearby complaining about the explosion and its resultant shockwave. The robot that attacks Mulder was inspired by the Sojourner rover and cost $23,000 to create. The producers secured satellite photos of the Washington D.C. area by contacting Spot Image, a satellite company based in France.

The show hired a freelance computer artist to generate a 3D image of Scully for the scene in which she glitches out after fighting a group of nurses in a virtual hospital. Gillian Anderson was very pleased with the scene, later noting, "I happened to be in good shape at the time and was just raring to get in there and be taking those half-naked nurses out with some karate chops." David Duchovny was not as exuberant; when showed the script and directed to "be impressed with [Scully's] karate skills", he responded, "But I have no arms. I've lost my arms. Why would I care about Scully's karate?" Dean Haglund later called the sequence "one of the great fight scenes, ever".

== Reception ==
=== Ratings ===
"Kill Switch" premiered on the Fox network on February 15, 1998. This episode earned a Nielsen rating of 11.1, with a 16 share, meaning that roughly 11.1 percent of all television-equipped households, and 16 percent of households watching television, were tuned in to the episode. It was viewed by 18.04 million viewers.

"Kill Switch" made frequent appearances in reruns, resulting in Gibson and Maddox writing a second X-Files episode titled "First Person Shooter" during the show's seventh season.

=== Reviews ===
"Kill Switch" received largely positive reviews from critics. Francis Dass of New Straits Times was positive toward the episode, calling it "excellent". Robert Shearman and Lars Pearson, in their book Wanting to Believe: A Critical Guide to The X-Files, Millennium & The Lone Gunmen, rated the episode four stars out of five. The two wrote that its themes were "fresh and new" and that the plot had "real heart to it". Shearman and Pearson wrote positively of Mulder's virtual experiencing, praising "kickboxing Scully" and calling her "supercool". Emily VanDerWerff of The A.V. Club gave the episode a B+ and wrote that, while "William Gibson's cyberpunk milieu wouldn't necessarily seem to be the best fit for The X-Files", the episode "weirdly benefits from the lack of staff oversight." She noted that it featured many elements to its plot, but was "a rare example of an X-Files episode that works, even though it tries to do too much." VanDerWerff praised the story and the fact that Scully was featured heavily in the episode. She cited the scene where a virtual Scully roundhouse kicks a group of nurses as one of the best shots in the episode, and called it a "hysterical moment". Brett Love of TV Squad stated that it is his favorite episode of The X-Files, considering it a "great story" and describing it as a "tough one to beat". Paula Vitaris of Cinefantastique gave the episode a positive review and awarded it three stars out of four. Vitaris praised the episode's directing and noted that the entry was "a great improvement over The X-Files's earlier A.I. episode, first season's 'Ghost in the Machine'". Vitaris cited "Mulder's virtual experience" as the "highlight of the episode".

=== Awards ===
"Kill Switch" earned an Emmy Award from the Academy of Television Arts & Sciences for Outstanding Picture Editing - Series.

== Bibliography ==
- Gradnitzer, Louisa; Pittson, Todd (1999). X Marks the Spot: On Location with The X-Files. Arsenal Pulp Press. ISBN 1-55152-066-4.
- Hurwitz, Matt; Knowles, Chris (2008). The Complete X-Files: Behind the Series the Myths and the Movies. New York, US: Insight Editions. ISBN 978-1933784724.
- Meisler, Andy (1999), Resist or Serve: The Official Guide to The X-Files, Vol. 4, London: HarperCollins, ISBN 0-00-257133-1
- Shearman, Robert; Pearson, Lars (2009). Wanting to Believe: A Critical Guide to The X-Files, Millennium & The Lone Gunmen. Mad Norwegian Press. ISBN 978-0975944691.
