= Westham Island =

Island in Delta, British Columbia

Coordinates: 49°05′N 123°09′W

- Interactive map of Westham Island

Geography
- Location: Fraser River

Administration
- Canada
- Province: British Columbia
- City: Delta

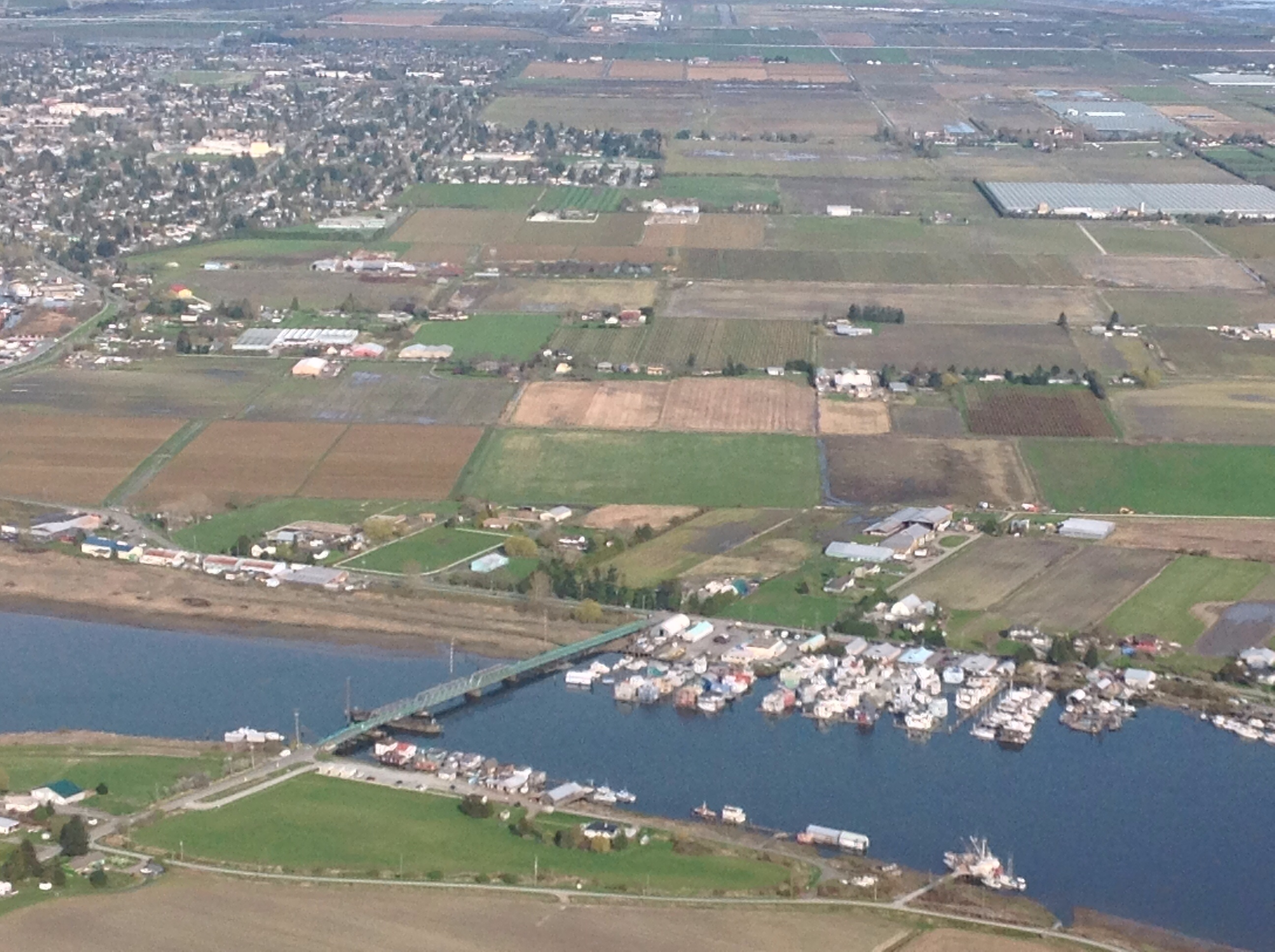
East-facing aerial view of the Westham Island Bridge

Westham Island is an island located near Ladner, a neighbourhood of Delta, British Columbia, Canada, which in turn is a part of the Greater Vancouver area. The George C. Reifel Migratory Bird Sanctuary for migratory birds is located at the northern end of the island, home to over 300 bird species. Every year in October, almost 85,000 Lesser Snow Geese arrive as they travel from Wrangel Island to the Atlantic. The Alaksen National Wildlife Area is also located on the island.

The Westham Island Swing Bridge was built to connect the island to Ladner; opened on March 29, 1910, it is one of the oldest bridges in the province. A rehabilitation of the bridge was completed in 2010.

The island was named by Harry Trim who came from Westham, Sussex.
