= Tom Maddox =

American science fiction writer (1945–2022)

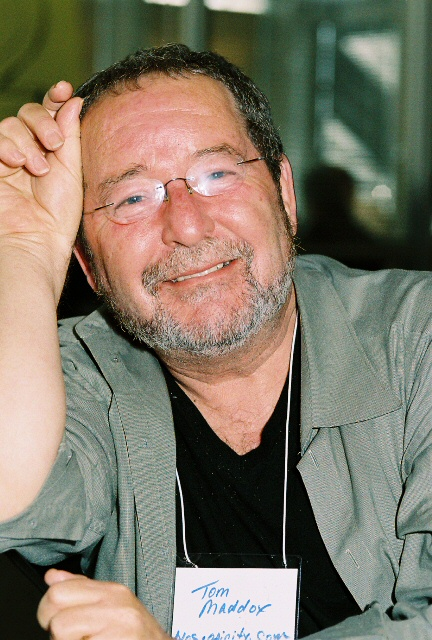
- Maddox at the Internet Identity Workshop in 2006
- Born: October , 1945; Beckley, West Virginia, U.S.
- Died: October 18, 2022 (aged 77)
- Occupations: Professor; novelist; short story author
- Writing career
- Period: 1985–2000
- Genre: Science fiction

Tom Maddox (October 7, 1945 – October 18, 2022) was an American science fiction writer, known for his part in the early cyberpunk movement.

Maddox's only novel was Halo (ISBN 0-312-85249-5), published in 1991 by Tor Books. His story "Snake Eyes" appeared in the 1986 collection Mirrorshades, edited by Bruce Sterling. He was perhaps best known as a friend and writing partner of William Gibson. They wrote two episodes of The X-Files together, "Kill Switch" and "First Person Shooter".

The term Intrusion Countermeasures Electronics (ICE) was conceived by Maddox. According to him, he coined the term in the manuscript of an unpublished story that he showed to Gibson at a science fiction convention in Portland, Oregon. Gibson asked permission to use the acronym, and Maddox agreed. The term was then used in Gibson's early short stories and eventually popularized in the novel Neuromancer, in which Maddox was acknowledged.

Maddox licensed his work under a Creative Commons license, making a significant part of it available on his website.

Maddox also served as a professor of literary studies at The Evergreen State College in Olympia, Washington.

Maddox died from a stroke on October 18, 2022, at the age of 77.

== Works ==
=== Novels ===
- Halo (1991)

=== Short stories ===
- "The Mind Like a Strange Balloon" (1985)
- "Snake-Eyes" (1986)
- "Spirit of the Night" (1987)
- "The Robot and the One You Love" (1988)
- "Florida" (1989)—a very short story written to fit on a bookmark—contributed to Magicon.
- "Baby Strange" (1989)
- "Gravity's Angel" (1992)
