= Cranberry Marsh/Starratt Wildlife Management Area =

Wildlife Management Area in Valemount, British Columbia

- IUCN category IV (habitat/species management area)
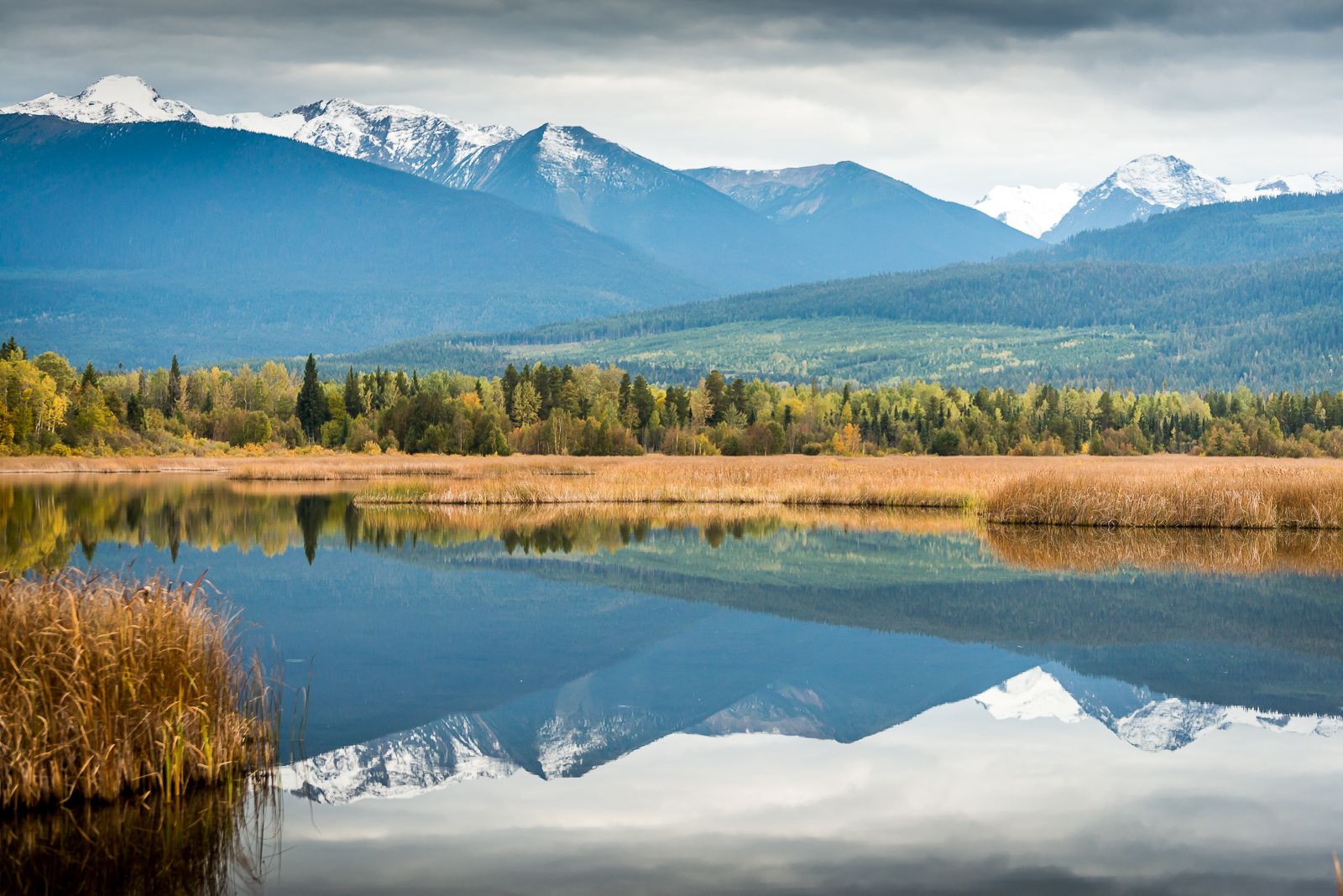

- Location within British Columbia
- Location: Valemount, British Columbia
- Coordinates: 52°47′30″N 119°13′46″W
- Area: 319 ha (790 acres)
- Designation: Wildlife Management Area
- Established: 28 March 2013
- Governing body: FLNRORD
- Website: Cranberry Marsh/Starratt WMA

Cranberry Marsh/Starratt Wildlife Management Area is a wildlife management area located just south of Valemount, British Columbia. It was established by the British Columbia Ministry of Forests, Lands, Natural Resource Operations and Rural Development (FLNRORD) on 28 March 2013 to protect Cranberry Marsh, a freshwater marsh that serves as an important breeding ground and stopover for a variety of migratory birds.

== Description ==
Cranberry Marsh is the remnant of a flat bottom lake which now drains through the lower east slopes of the valley. Despite its natural appearance, the marsh has been greatly altered to improve the quality of the wetland habitat for migratory birds and resident species. The area also features a 5.5 km loop trail encircling the marsh and a small wooden tower for birding.

== Ecology ==
The marsh features a patchwork of sedges and cattails among small stretches of open water. Strands of aspen and willow can be found along its shores. Resident mammal species include beaver, muskrat, and moose.

The marsh is located at the junction of the Columbian and Thompson-Okanagan bird migration corridors, which results in a variety migratory bird species using the marsh as a flyway stopover and a breeding ground. It also serves as a critical habitat for blue-listed American Bittern.

== See also ==
- Columbia National Wildlife Area
