= Strait of Georgia and Howe Sound Glass Sponge Reef Marine Refuge =

Strait of Georgia and Howe Sound Glass Sponge Reef
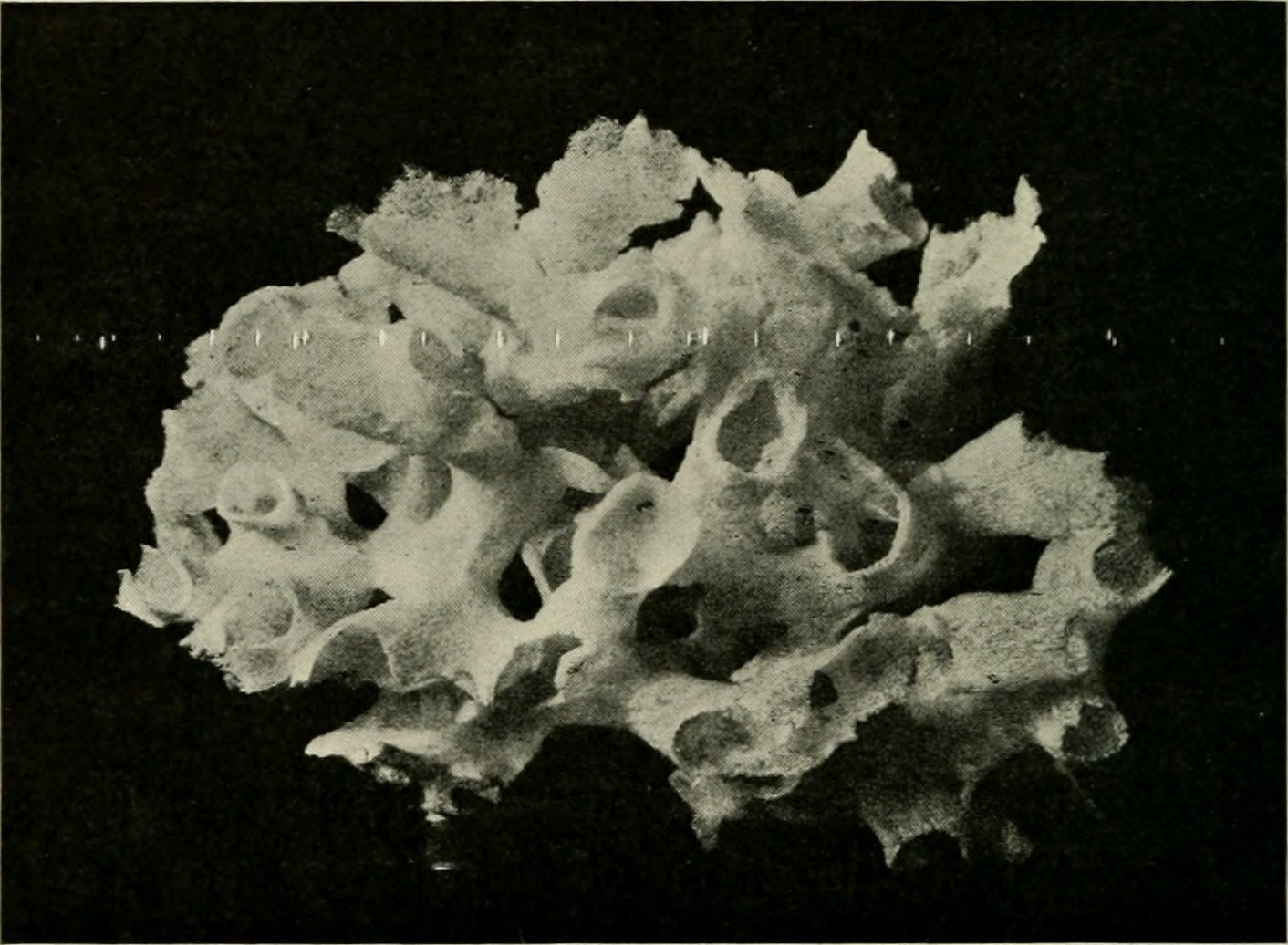
- Farrea occa, a species of glass sponge found within the Strait of Georgia and Howe Sound Glass Sponge Reef
- Designation: Marine Refuge
- Established: 2019
- Governing body: Fisheries and Oceans Canada

The Strait of Georgia and Howe Sound Glass Sponge Reef Marine Refuge is a marine refuge in the Strait of Georgia and Howe Sound, off the coast of Vancouver, British Columbia, Gambier Island, and Bowen Island. The marine refuge was established in 2019 and managed by the Department of Fisheries and Oceans Canada. The area was created with the goal of preserving glass sponge reefs.

== History ==
The Strait of Georgia and Howe Sound Glass Sponge Reef was discovered in 2001. Radiocarbon dating has suggested that similar hexactinellid sponge reefs within British Columbia started forming around 7000 BC.

Since 2019, the reef has been designated a marine refuge by Fisheries and Oceans Canada, which banned bottom trawling fishing in the area in order to protect the glass sponge species which are easily damaged by such fishing techniques due to the fragile silica-based structure of the sponges.

== Biodiversity ==
The reef is primarily built by three species of glass sponges, including the fingered goblet sponge (Heterochone calyx), cloud sponge (Aphrocallistes vastus), and Farrea occa. Living reefs of such species of glass sponges have been documented to have carbon removal rates of 1 gC/m2 per day, comparable to the carbon removal rates of old-growth forests (0.658 gC/m2 per day). Given these carbon removal rates, further research into using such reefs as a buffer against ocean acidification have been proposed.

The reef provides habitat for many marine species including juvenile rockfish, spiny dogfish, spot prawn, Pacific blood star, Sunflower sea star, and California sea cucumber.
