= Southern Strait of Georgia National Marine Conservation Area Reserve =

The Southern Strait of Georgia National Marine Conservation Area Reserve is a proposed federal marine protected area in the southern part of the Strait of Georgia, between roughly Haro Strait and Gabriola Passage, intended to conserve marine ecosystems while allowing sustainable use. It has not yet been formally established in law; it is still in the feasibility and planning stage, led by Parks Canada in partnership with local First Nations and the Province of British Columbia.

The proposed boundary, as of 2011, covers approximately 1,400 square kilometres of marine waters.
