= Serpentine River (British Columbia) =

Coordinates: 49°04′59″N 122°51′00″W

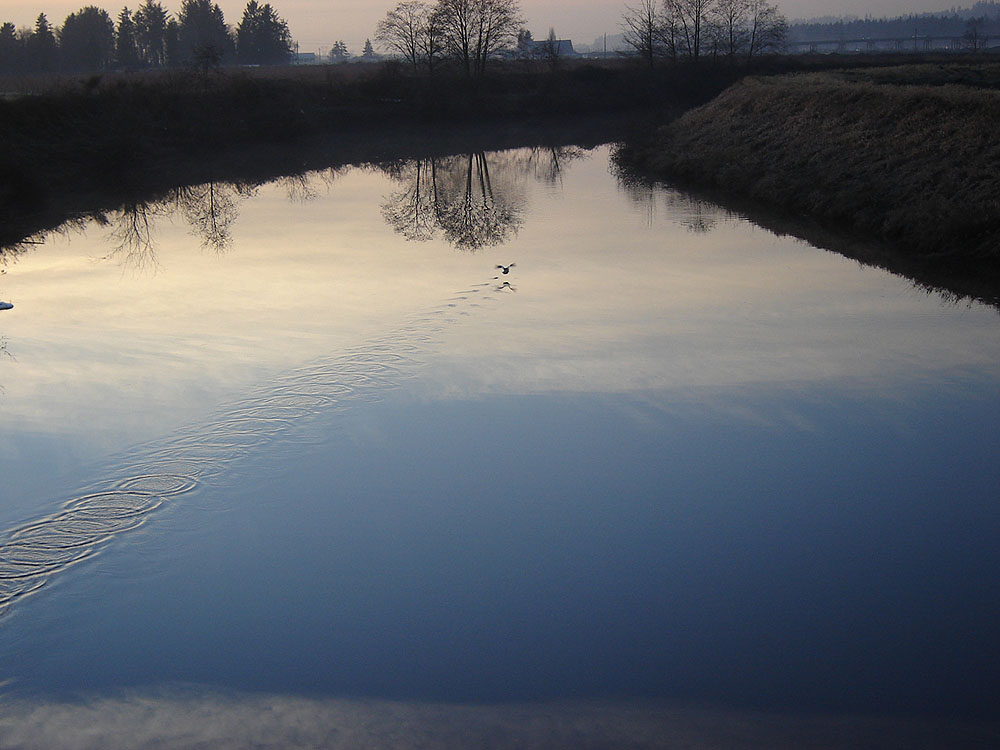
Serpentine River, near 152 Street, Surrey, BC

Map

The Serpentine River's headwaters are in North Surrey, British Columbia. The river winds its way to its mouth at Mud Bay, off the Strait of Georgia and is extensively irrigated. It has a watershed area of 116 km^{2} and a total length of 35 km. The marshy Serpentine Wildlife Area ('Serpentine Fen') near where the river passes beneath King George Boulevard, is a stopping place for migratory birds, waterfowl and a variety of animals.

== See also ==
- List of rivers of British Columbia
