= George C. Reifel Migratory Bird Sanctuary =

Migratory bird sanctuary in Delta, British Columbia, Canada

- IUCN category Ia (strict nature reserve)
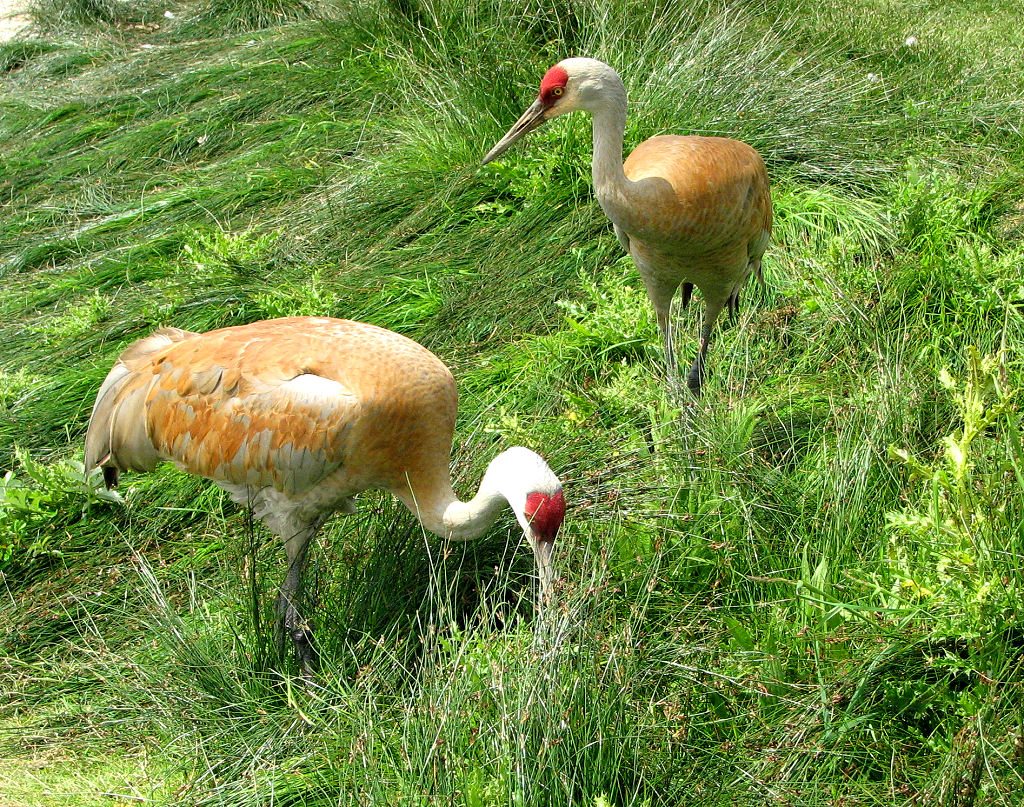
- Sandhill cranes

- Location within British Columbia Location within Greater Vancouver Regional District
- Location: Westham Island, Delta, British Columbia
- Coordinates: 49°05′51″N 123°09′58″W
- Area: 648 ha (1,600 acres)
- Designation: Migratory Bird Sanctuary
- Established: 1967
- Governing body: Canadian Wildlife Service
- Website: www.reifelbirdsanctuary.com

George C. Reifel Migratory Bird Sanctuary is a protected area in Delta, British Columbia, Canada, and is part of the Fraser River estuary, designated a site of Hemispheric Importance by the Western Hemisphere Shorebird Reserve Network.

The area includes managed wetlands, marshes and dikes. The 300-hectare (740-acre) area has numerous walking trails, bird blinds, lookouts, and a gift shop. It has resident nesting sites for sandhill cranes, bald eagles, mallards, spotted towhees and many others. Migrants include, lesser snow geese, greater and lesser yellowlegs, long-billed dowitchers, and western sandpipers. Over 250 species have so far been recorded in the sanctuary. The sanctuary is open year-round from 9 am to 4 pm local time.

== History ==
George C. Reifel bought the sanctuary land in 1927 and originally used it as a working farm and family retreat. Reifel's son, George H. Reifel first leased the land to the British Columbia Waterfowl Society for use as a sanctuary in the 1960s. In 1972, the Reifel family "agreed to a combination of land sale and donation to the federal government on the condition that it would continue to be managed for the primary benefit of waterfowl and that the Sanctuary would continue to bear the name of George C. Reifel".

The Alaksen National Wildlife Area, which was also part of the Reifel family land, was designated as an NWA in 1972 and is managed by the Canadian Wildlife Service.

== See also ==
- Alaksen National Wildlife Area
