= Boundary Bay Wildlife Management Area =

Wildlife Management Area in British Columbia, Canada

- IUCN category IV (habitat/species management area)
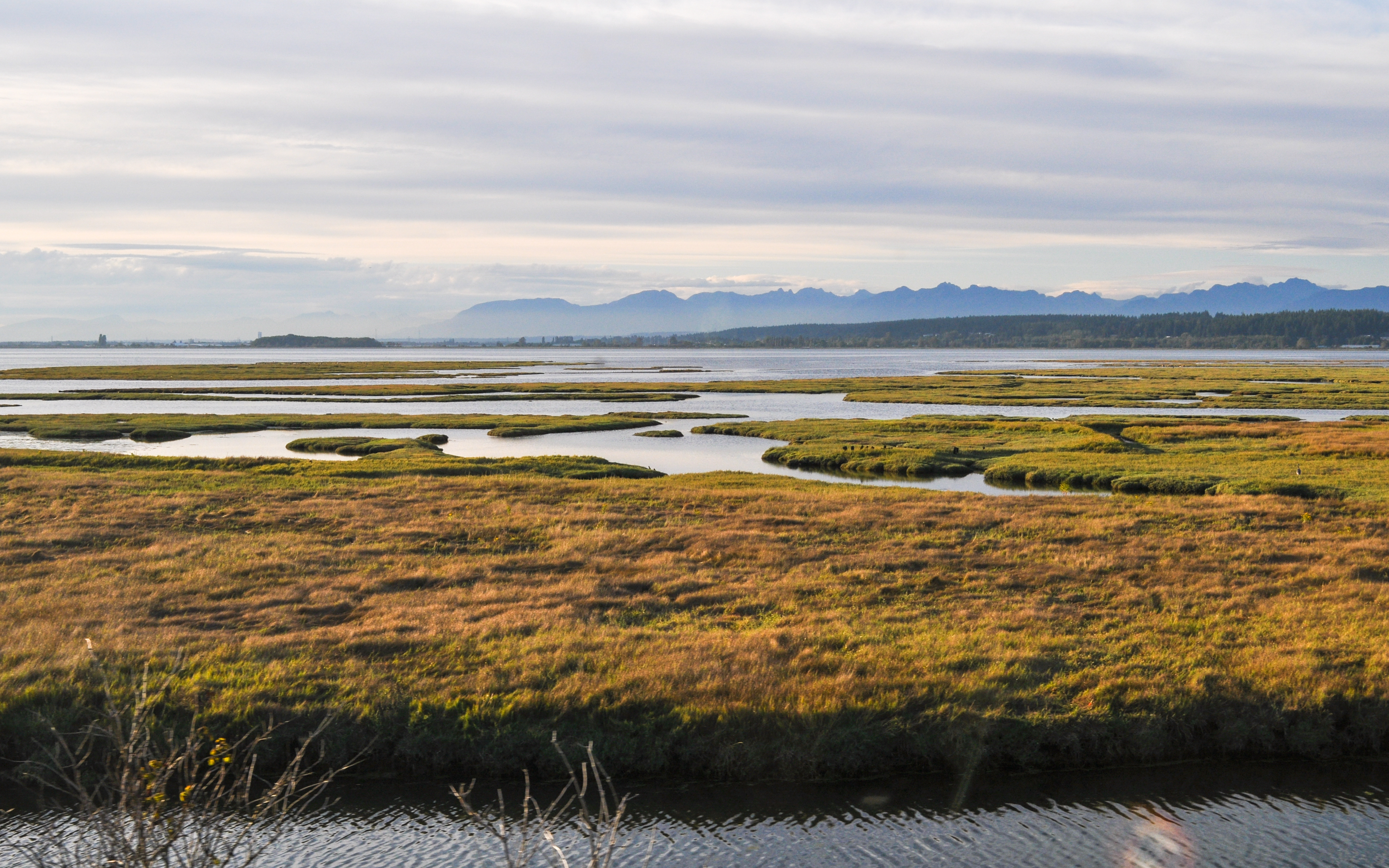
- Tidal flats of Mud Bay

- Location within British Columbia Location within Greater Vancouver Regional District
- Location: Boundary Bay, British Columbia, Canada
- Coordinates: 49°02′38″N 122°57′13″W
- Area: 11,470 ha (44.3 sq mi)
- Designation: Wildlife Management Area
- Established: 21 June 1995
- Governing body: FLNRORD

Boundary Bay Wildlife Management Area is a wildlife management area encompassing the entire Canadian portion of Boundary Bay in the Lower Mainland of British Columbia. It was established by the British Columbia Ministry of Forests, Lands, Natural Resource Operations and Rural Development (FLNRORD) on 21 June 1995 to conserve critical habitat for migratory bird species and resident fish and marine mammal species. It is part of the larger Fraser River Delta Ramsar Site.

== Description ==
The wildlife management area encompasses the entirety of Boundary Bay, a shallow bay of the Salish Sea straddling the border between the Canadian province of British Columbia and the U.S. state of Washington. The northeastern portion of the bay, named Mud Bay after the large mudflats found there, is of particular importance due to the region's high biodiversity and ecological productivity.

The management area also protects the estuaries of the Serpentine and Nicomekl rivers, both of which drain into Mud Bay from the northeast.

== Ecology ==
The intertidal salt marshes and mudflats of Boundary Bay support large communities of sea asparagus and various grasses. Common bird species found in the wildlife management area include American wigeon, great blue heron, western sandpiper, rough-legged hawk, northern harrier, bald eagle, and barn owl.

The bay supports a large harbour seal population, attracts grey whales and orcas, and provides spawning and feeding grounds for salmonids and Pacific herring.

== See also ==
- Alaksen National Wildlife Area
