= Gwaxdlala/Nalaxdlala (Lull/Hoeya) Marine Refuge =

Marine refuge in British Columbia, Canada

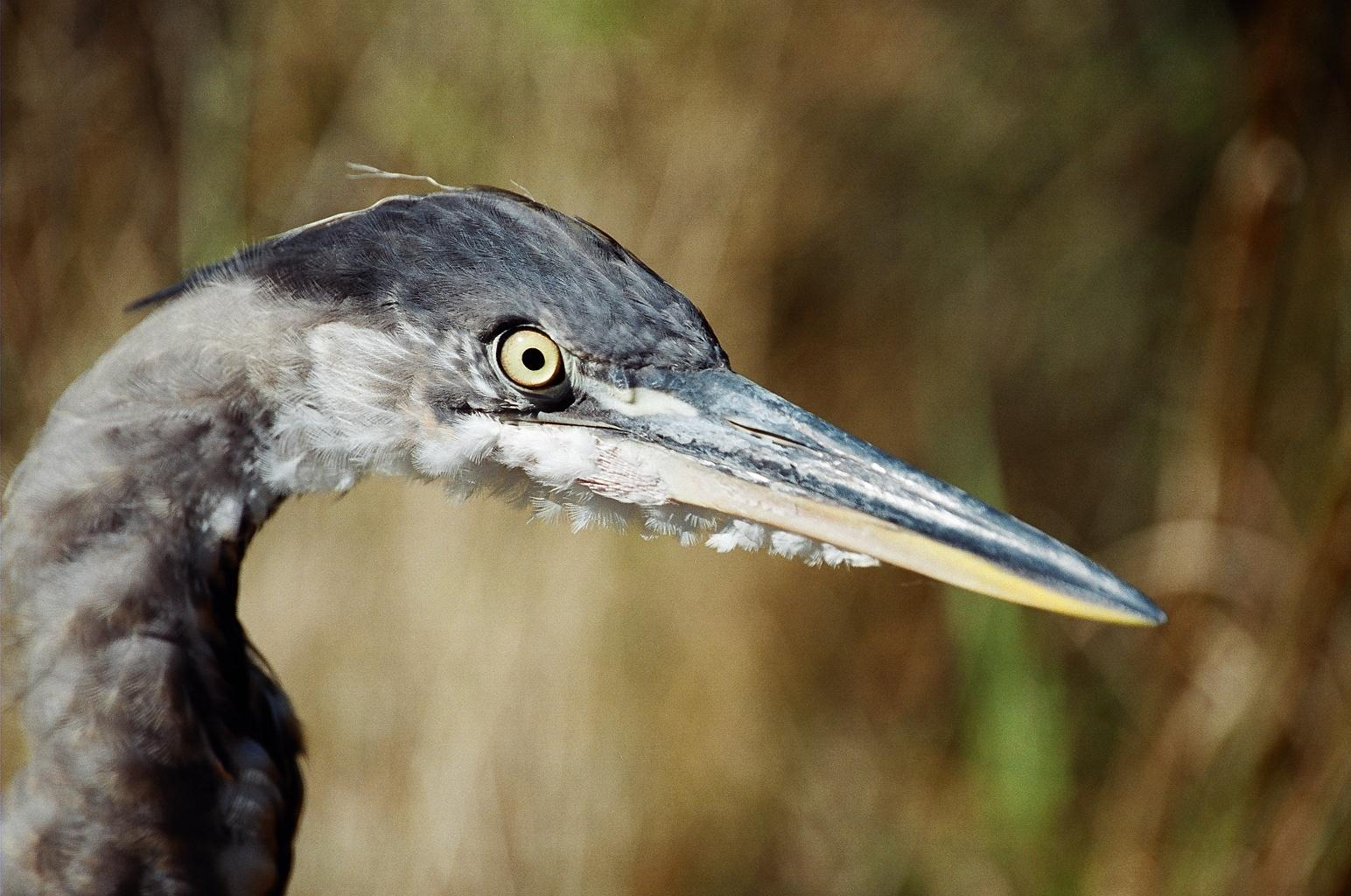
- Great blue heron in the Knight Inlet

- Location within British Columbia
- Location: Knight Inlet, British Columbia, Canada
- Coordinates: 50°41′34″N 126°00′23.7″W
- Area: 2,140 ha (8.3 sq mi)
- Designation: Marine refuge
- Established: 2023
- Governing body: Fisheries and Oceans Canada

The Gwaxdlala/Nalaxdlala (Lull/Hoeya) Marine Refuge is located in Knight Bay on the Central Coast of British Columbia, Canada, and encompasses Lull Bay, Hoeya Sound, and their corresponding watersheds. This marine refuge was officially established on November 29, 2021, by the Mamalilikulla First Nation, and created in partnership with Fisheries and Oceans Canada and the British Columbia provincial government. It was created with the purpose of protecting biodiversity, endangered species, and Indigenous culture and heritage in an area with unique physical geography and oceanography.

== Establishment ==
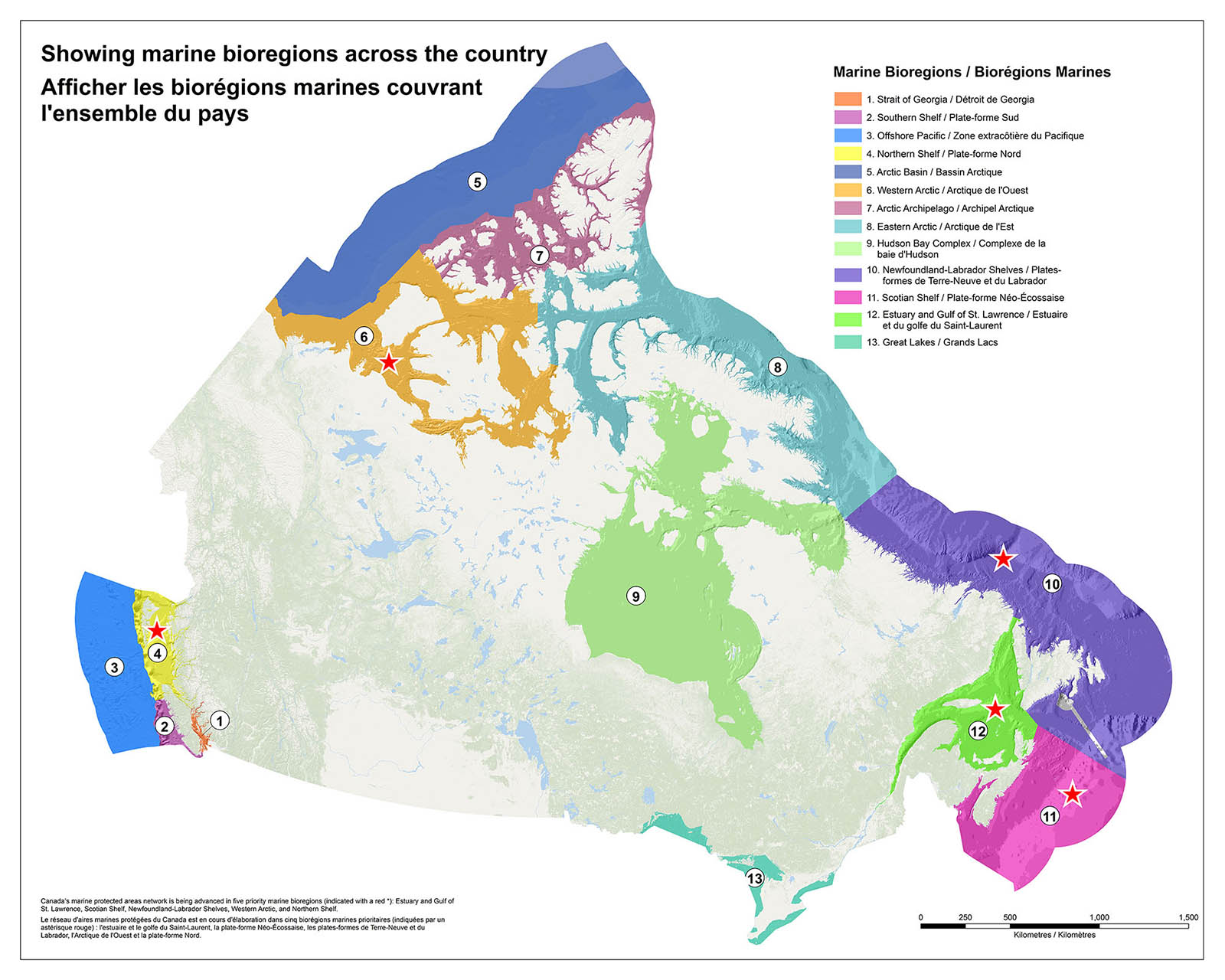
Marine Bioregions of Canada. The yellow section (4) is the Northern Shelf Bioregion, located in British Columbia.

The Gwaxdlala/Nalaxdlala Marine Refuge is 21.4 square kilometres (8.3 sq mi), less than 0.01% of Canada's total ocean conservation goals. The refuge is the first to be part of a larger Marine Protected Area (MPA) network in the Northern Shelf Bioregion. The process to establish the MPA started in 2006 and was implemented in 2023. The bioregion, as a whole, is biologically significant among Canada's coastline. The region around the marine refuge is also culturally significant to the Mamalilikulla First Nation, who use the area for fishing, hunting, and timber-harvesting, and have lived in the territory since time immemorial. In 2012, Mamalilikulla First Nation realized the significance of Hoeya Sill. As a result, the sill became notable to the Department of Fisheries and Oceans in 2016. Eventually, the First Nation declared the area an Indigenous Protected and Conserved Area (IPCA) that includes the interconnected ecosystems of Lull Bay, Hoeya Sound, and the surrounding watersheds.

The British Columbia provincial government, the Canadian federal government, and fifteen First Nations worked together to form a Network Action Plan and apply regulation to the marine refuge. The Project Finance for Permanence (PFP) model serves as the model for funding the management of the refuge. PFP is the same framework that funds the stewardship of the Great Bear Rainforest. The marine refuge is governed by the Fisheries Act, Land Act Section 17, and the Wildlife Act (BC).

== Purpose ==
=== Preservation of Lull Bay and Hoeya Sound ===
Mamalilikulla First Nation has the inherent responsibility to care for the land and sea within their territory because they have never relinquished their Aboriginal Rights and Title. The First Nation established the Indigenous Protected and Conserved Area (IPCA) in response to the endorsement of the United Nations Declaration on the Rights of Indigenous Peoples by the provincial and federal governments. The marine refuge is meant to endure, thereby safeguarding biodiversity, mitigating the effects of climate change, and contributing to the Canadian federal government's goal of preserving 25% of Canadian waters by 2025.

As a shallow oceanic ecosystem, the marine refuge sequesters carbon, provides a source of food, and serves as habitat for other organisms. Meanwhile, biodiversity is influential on human welfare and vital for ecological viability. Furthermore, Indigenous harvesting practices depend on healthy populations of native species. However, aquatic organisms face environmental pressures, such as increasing temperatures, over-exploitation, pollution, and coastal infrastructure development. Profit-oriented harvesting, leisure-based fishing, mining, and waste-dumping would all damage the ecosystem around the refuge.

=== Protection of the marine ecosystem ===
Although trawling and tuna fishing were already not permitted in the area before the establishment of the refuge, Hoeya Sill was still a place to fish for salmon by gillnet and to stockpile timber from forestry activities upstream. The establishment of the refuge prohibited commercial and leisure fishing and other detrimental human activities within the zone. The purpose of the fishing prohibition is to preserve the coral, seagrass, and kelp, and to maintain ecosystem services that they provide. Tour and leisure boats are subject to constraints because the marine refuge is a breeding site for seabirds.

== Indigenous involvement ==
=== Joint management ===
The Gwaxdlala/Nalaxdlala (Lull/Hoeya) Marine Refuge was established through joint efforts by Fisheries and Oceans Canada, the provincial government, British Columbia Ministries, and the Mamalilikulla First Nation. On November 29, 2021, the Mamalilikulla First Nation officially established an Indigenous Protected and Conserved Area (IPCA) for a 10,416-hectare area of Knight Bay on the Central Coast of British Columbia, that included the marine ecosystems of Lull Bay and Hoeya Sound, along with their corresponding watersheds. The foundation for the IPCA was based on prioritizing conservation of the Lull Bay and Hoeya Sound area, while ensuring the Mamalilikulla First Nation is able to survive and thrive in the area. The Mamalilikulla's management plans outlined in the IPCA, in partnership with provincial ministries, was used to create a complete and wide-ranging conservation plan that covers all areas outline in the IPCA. The provincial government, along with local ministries, are ensuring that any future plans reflect joint planning and management with the Mamalilikulla First Nation.

=== Mamalilikulla First Nation's history on the land ===
Hoeya Sound is the ancestral home of the people of the Mamalilikulla First Nation. The people of the Mamalilikulla community historically used the land as a village site where community members participated in activities such as hunting, fishing, and trapping. Due to this Nation's history in the area, many important archaeological sites are present. Various reports from 2018 indicate that the Mamalilikulla wish to achieve multiple goals for the IPCA through joint management with government and ministries; these goals include initiatives based on their knowledge of the land that prioritize the protection of habitats, species, culture and cultural connections, archaeological sites, and food security. The First Nation aims to protect these aspects of their land and community by incorporating ecosystem management and holistic approaches to conservation. Ideally, these goals will benefit the Mamalilikulla community by providing new economic opportunities for the Nation.

=== Mamalilikulla First Nation's involvement ===
The creation of the IPCA declaration would not have been possible without a substantial amount of work, commitment, and effort from the Mamalilikulla First Nation Community. Members attended community meetings, collected documents, conducted studies, and created management plans that significantly contributed to the success of the IPCA. In February 2023, the marine portion of the IPCA was officially recognized as the first marine refuge designated in the Northern Shelf Bioregion Marine Protected Areas Network planning process.

== Physical geography and oceanography ==
The Gwaxdlala/Nalaxdlala Marine Refuge lies below the Gwaxdlala/Nalaxdlala Indigenous Protected and Conserved Area, in the middle of Knight Inlet. Lull Bay, Hoeya Sound, and the Hoeya Head Sill are included within the 21.4 square kilometres (8.3 sq mi) area, along with a section of the inlet. It lies within the Northern Shelf bioregion. Research suggests that the Hoeya Head Sill's oceanography is the reason for such high amounts of biodiversity in this area. Internal waves are created because of the heavier salt water on the bottom of the inlet and the lighter fresh water on the surface. These waves move inside the body of water rather than on the surface. Because of the tidal mixing of fresh and salt water, the Hoeya Head Sill has very high biological productivity.

== Biodiversity ==
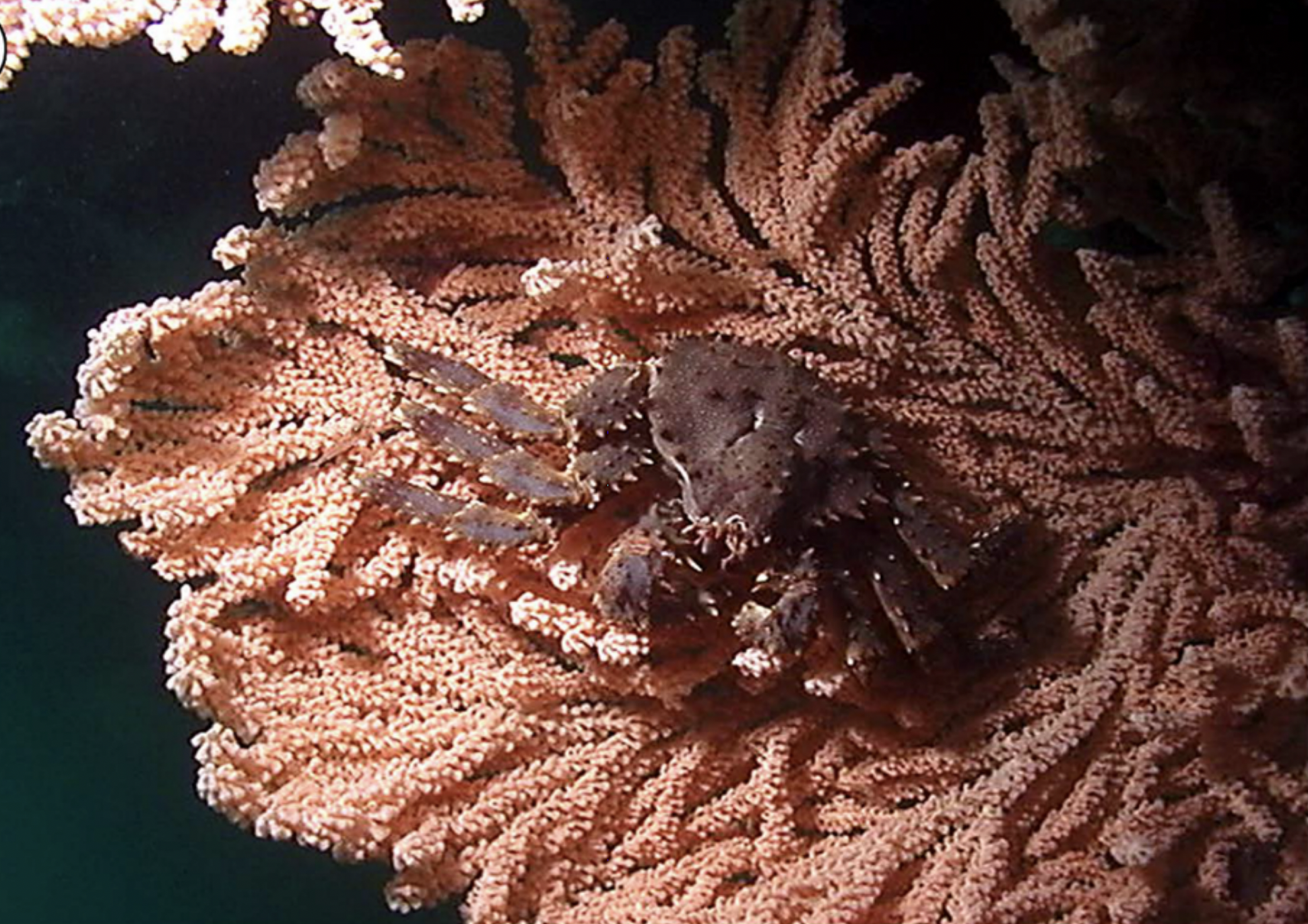
Primnoa pacifica in Tracy Arm Fjord, Alaska, at 18 metres deep

The refuge is very biodiverse and is home to over 240 species. There are over 46 species of sponges, anemones, and corals which provide shelter for other organisms.

One of these species of coral is Primnoa pacifica, which is commonly known as the red tree coral. Primnoa pacifica creates structure for suspension feeders, such as anemones and sponges, while also creating shelter for other organisms like crustaceans and rockfish. Hoeya Head Sill's lowest depth is 65 metres (213 ft), but this coral is usually found at much lower depths of 150–250 metres (490–820 ft). The shallowest water depth that Primnoa pacifica has ever been found in was 9 metres (30 ft) in Alaska, in both Tracy Arm Fjord and Glacier Bay; it was found at depths of 12 metres (39 ft) in Hoeya Head Sill. Primnoa pacifica at this depth is rare, and this is the only area in coastal British Columbia with a Primnoa pacifica population. A few other species that are usually found in deep ocean but are also found in the Hoeya Head Sill include the shrimp Eualus townsendi, Hemitripterus bolini (bigmouth sculpin), and two species of sponges: Aphrocallistes vastus and Amphilectus infundibulus.

The creation of the Gwaxdlala/Nalaxdlala Marine Refuge means that fishing is prohibited, and the area cannot be used for recreational or commercial reasons. This will protect sponges, corals, and other structural organisms that live along the bottom of the Sill and can be harmed by fishing methods involving contact with the seafloor (bottom-contact fishing). The Canadian federal government also considers the Gwaxdlala/Nalaxdlala Marine Refuge as a contribution to the 30 by 30 goals laid out at the Convention on Biological Diversity, which is an international goal to protect 30% of water and land by 2030.

== Endangered species and species at risk ==
=== Rock fish ===
One of the species protected within the Gwaxdlala/Nalaxdlala Marine Refuge is rockfish. There are three different kinds of rockfish listed under Canada's Species at Risk Act: the rougheye rockfish type I and II, and the yelloweye rockfish. These fish live for a very long time and subsequently take a long time to reach age of sexual maturity. This, in combination with their tendency to live in the same habitat their entire life, can adversely affect the population. Rockfish also need protection because being removed from the water can cause barotrauma; their closed swim bladders and inability to adapt to pressure changes cause these animals to puff up, causing harm.

=== Other species ===
Another fish species protected in this area is salmon. Not all species of Pacific salmon are endangered—some are also threatened, of special concern, and not at risk.

The refuge also protects coral fans. These corals, specifically gorgonian corals, are uniquely found here at much shallower depth than normally observed. Certain fishing practices and recreational activities can damage these corals, so there is a ban on these practices within this area. The corals are significant because they are used by multiple species as homes and spawning grounds.
