= Alaksen National Wildlife Area =

National Wildlife Area of Canada in Delta, British Columbia

- IUCN category V (protected landscape/seascape)
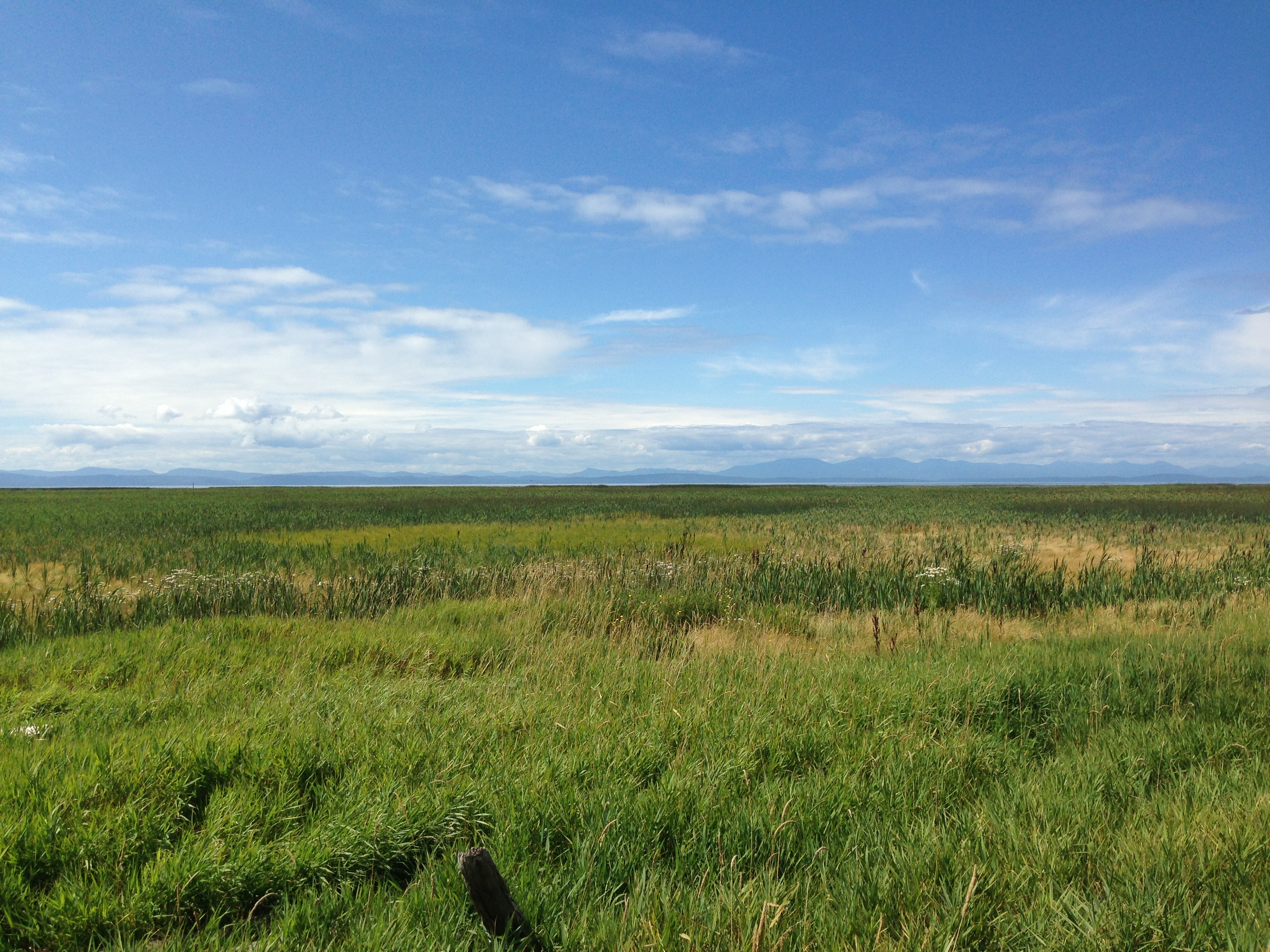

- Location within British Columbia Location within Greater Vancouver Regional District
- Location: Westham Island, Delta, British Columbia
- Coordinates: 49°06′N 123°10′W
- Area: 349 ha (860 acres)
- Designation: National Wildlife Area
- Established: 1976
- Governing body: Canadian Wildlife Service
- Website: Alaksen NWA

The Alaksen National Wildlife Area is located on Westham Island in the city of Delta, British Columbia. It is an important stopover point for many species of birds migrating along the Pacific Flyway.

== Geography ==
The Alaksen Area encompasses the northwestern half of Westham Island, which itself is located within the Fraser River Delta as it enters the Strait of Georgia. The Area comprises mostly cultivated farmland, but also includes freshwater and brackish tidal marshlands, mudflats, and some woodland. In addition to the cultivated crops, the site is vegetated by various grasses in the farmland; cattails, Lyngbye's sedge, and bulrushes in the intertidal zone; and Red alder, willows and Black cottonwood, along with snowberry, salmonberry, and blackberries in the wooded areas.

The Area overlaps with the George C. Reifel Migratory Bird Sanctuary, which has stricter protections and doesn't feature cultivated farmland.

== History ==
The National Wildlife Area was officially protected under the Canada Wildlife Act in 1976. On May 24, 1987 Alaksen was designated a Wetland of International Significance under the Ramsar Convention, in combination with the George C. Reifel Migratory Bird Sanctuary, also on Westham Island. It was the ninth designated Canadian Ramsar site. It was chosen because it is "a major Pacific Flyway site for migratory waterfowl and shorebirds; an excellent example of deltaic and coastal tidal wetland environments; the largest migratory bird wintering area in Canada; and the largest estuarine habitat on the Pacific coast of Canada". The site was later incorporated within the larger Fraser River Delta Ramsar Site.

== Environmental value ==
The Alaksen National Wildlife Area provides a valuable wildlife area very close to the urban centre of Metro Vancouver, allowing many educational opportunities. The cropland frequently floods in the winter and occasionally freezes over for short periods. Varied seasonal management practices provide valuable habitat to wintering waterfowl & other species of wildlife.

Over forty species of waterfowl winter in the area, the most common being Canada goose, mallard, American widgeon, and lesser snow goose. Also abundant are raptors, including bald eagle, barn owl, and several species of falcon.

== Filming location ==
The reserve was used as a filming location for Huckleberry Finn and His Friends.

== See also ==
- List of National Wildlife Areas in British Columbia
- Boundary Bay Wildlife Management Area
