= Mud Bay, British Columbia =

Bay and locality in British Columbia, Canada

Coordinates: 49°04′32″N 122°52′41″W

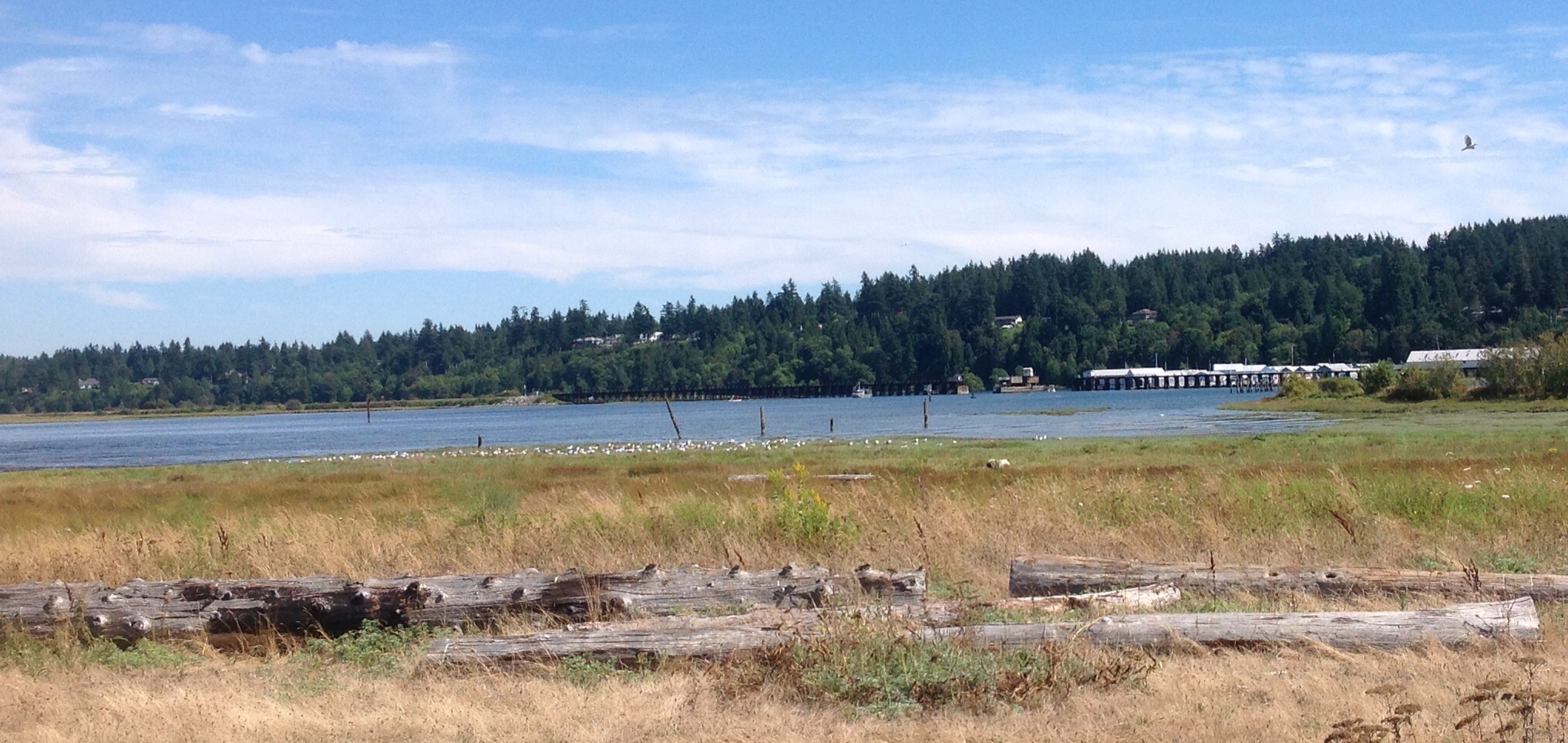
Mud Bay from Blackie Spit

Mud Bay is the name of the northeast side of Boundary Bay on the Canada–United States border, and an unincorporated place on the bay.
