= Fauna of Canada =

Native animals of Canada

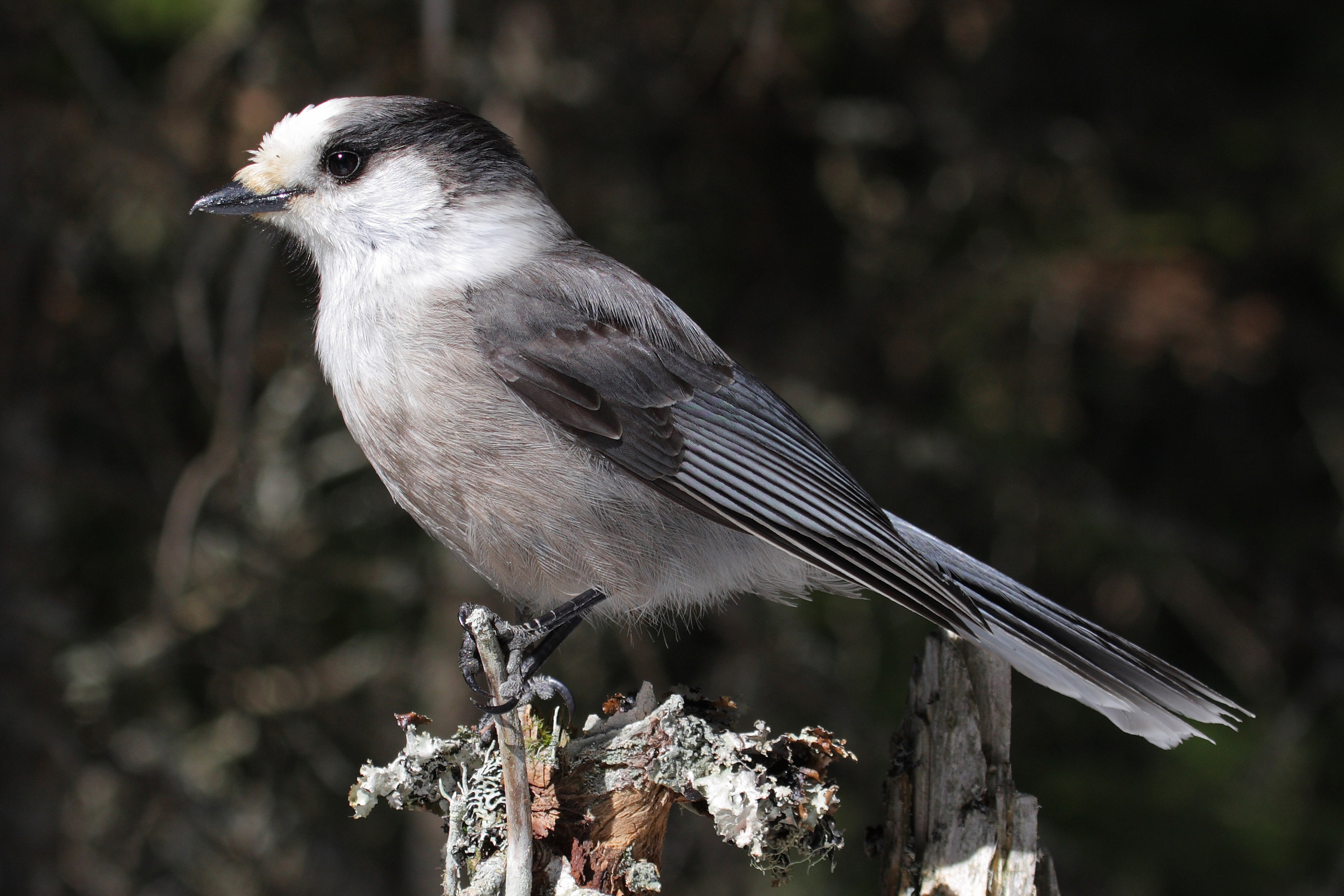
The Canada jay is found in the boreal forest north to the tree line, and in the Rocky Mountains subalpine zone.

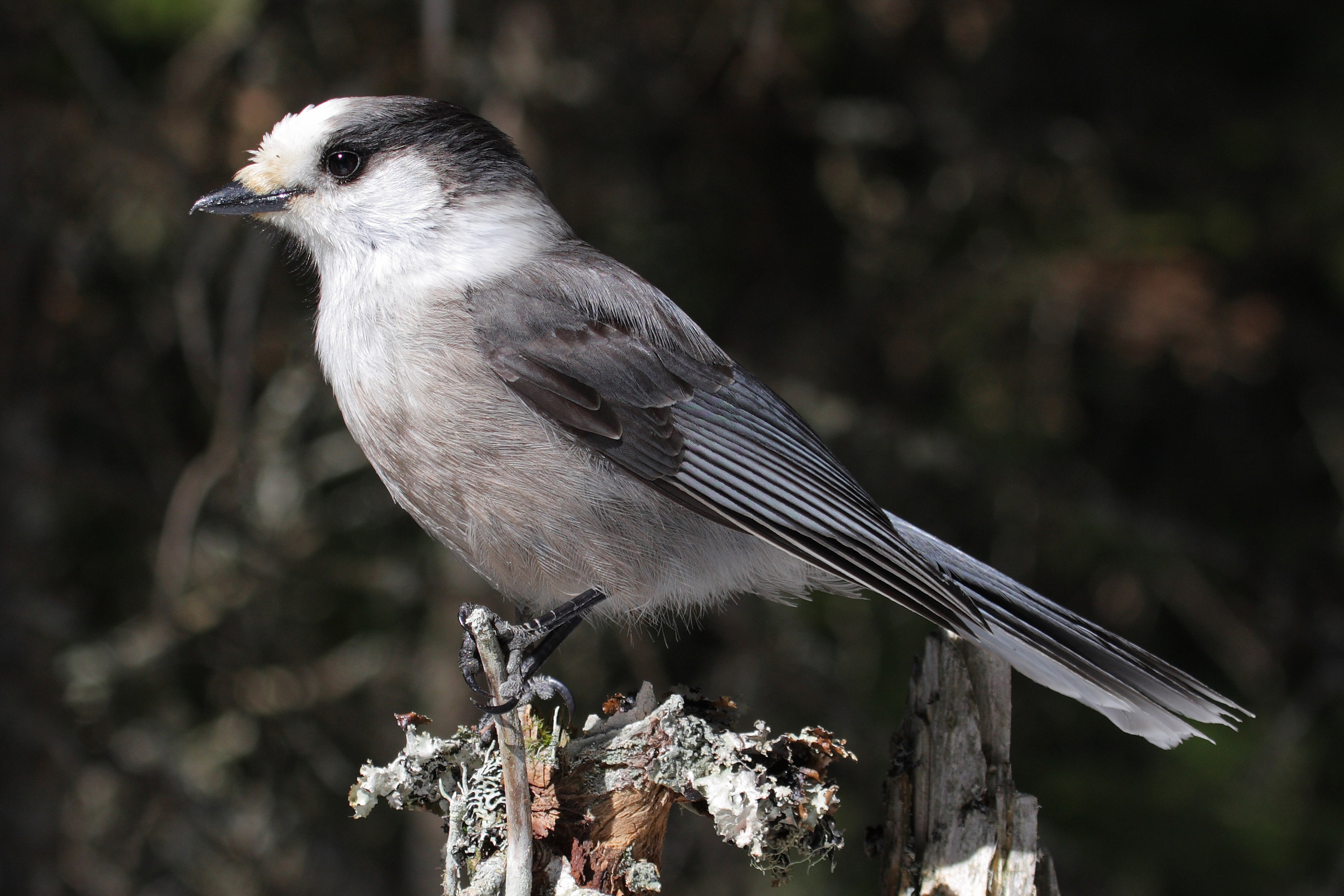
The Canada jay is found in the boreal forest north to the tree line, and in the Rocky Mountains subalpine zone.

Canada is home to about 80,000 known species, excluding viruses and bacteria. The Wild Species 2020 report, the most recent national assessment of the general status of species in Canada, covered 50,534 of them, of which 47,314 are native and 3,220 were introduced through human activity. The groups for which a complete Canadian species list exists include 223 mammals, 696 birds, 49 reptiles, 47 amphibians and 1,395 fishes, as well as 8,238 beetles, 5,430 moths and butterflies, 4,007 true bugs and 1,439 spiders. Insects account for nearly 70% of the known animal species in the country, while vertebrates make up less than 5% of the species covered by the report.

Canada's size and range of habitats, from oceanic coasts to mountains, prairies, boreal forest and Arctic tundra, support this diversity unevenly. Among the groups assessed, the regions with the most species were Ontario, with 25,776, British Columbia, with 24,540, and Quebec, with 21,933.

The most threatened wildlife species of Canada are listed in the List of Wildlife Species at Risk in accordance with the Canadian Species at Risk Act. Of the species given a numerical conservation rank in the Wild Species 2020 report, 80% are secure or apparently secure nationally, and one in five carries some level of risk. The report identified 2,253 species that may be at risk in Canada, and a further 135 that are presumed or possibly extirpated from the country. Species suspected of being at risk are assessed in detail by the Committee on the Status of Endangered Wildlife in Canada (COSEWIC), which evaluates species, subspecies and geographically or genetically distinct populations, collectively termed wildlife species. As of May 2025, COSEWIC had placed 864 wildlife species in its risk categories, comprising 378 endangered, 201 threatened, 263 of special concern and 22 extirpated, and had assessed a further 25 as extinct. The regions with the most endangered or threatened species are those in which humans have had the greatest impact on the environment. Protected areas of Canada and National Wildlife Areas have been established to preserve and restore Canadian flora and fauna.

== Vertebrates ==
=== Mammals ===
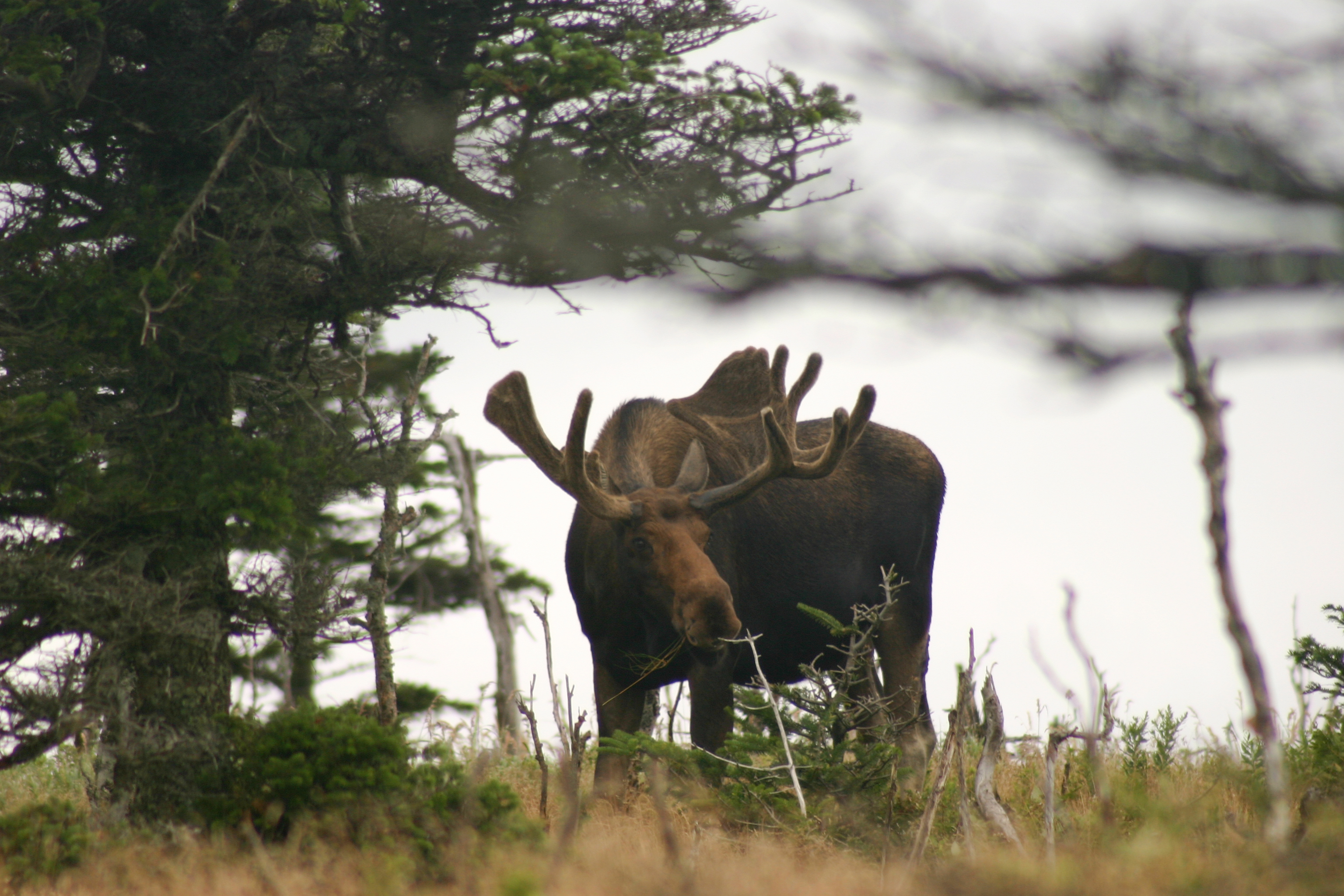
Eastern moose

Mammals are found in all the regions of Canada, and 223 species are known from the country. Members of six orders of placental mammals inhabit Canada. They are the bats, carnivores (including the pinnipeds), artiodactyls, cetaceans, insectivores, rodents, and lagomorphs. Additionally, one species of marsupial, the opossum, can now be found in southern Canada.

Because of its large wild spaces, Canada is home to many large mammals, some of which have been extirpated in more densely populated areas, for example, large predators such as the grey wolf and the brown bear. Well known as "Canadian" are those mammals that are comfortable in Northern Canada, such as the polar fox, caribou herds, the moose, the wolverine, and muskoxen herds. Other prominent Canadian mammals are the Canada lynx, and the North American beaver, which is a major symbol of Canada.

In addition to these native mammals, many Eurasian mammals were introduced (either intentionally or accidentally) by European colonists. Among them are domestic mammals, such as the horse, pig, sheep, dog, cat, and cattle, and wild mammals, such as the brown rat and the house mouse.

As of May 2025, COSEWIC had assessed 86 mammal wildlife species in its risk categories, along with five assessed as extinct.

=== Birds ===
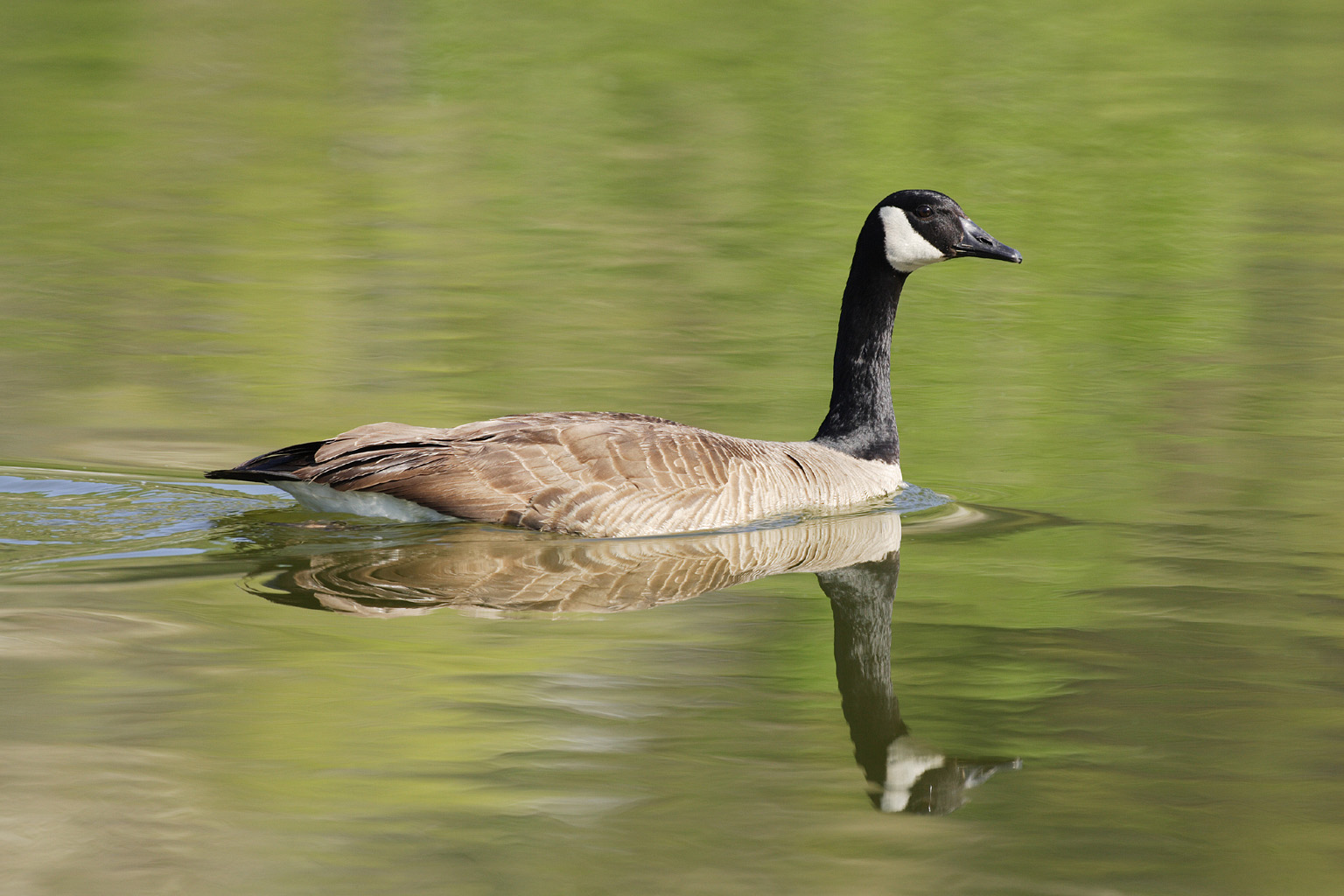
Canada goose

Canada's avifauna comprises 696 recorded species, the most of any vertebrate group in the country apart from the fishes. Birds are also the most widely distributed group assessed in the Wild Species reports, occurring on average in more than eight of Canada's eighteen provincial, territorial and ocean regions, and they make up the majority of the country's migratory species. The most commonly known birds include the Canada goose, snowy owl, and the common raven. Another prominent Canadian bird is the whooping crane, whose only breeding grounds are protected in Wood Buffalo National Park.

=== Reptiles ===
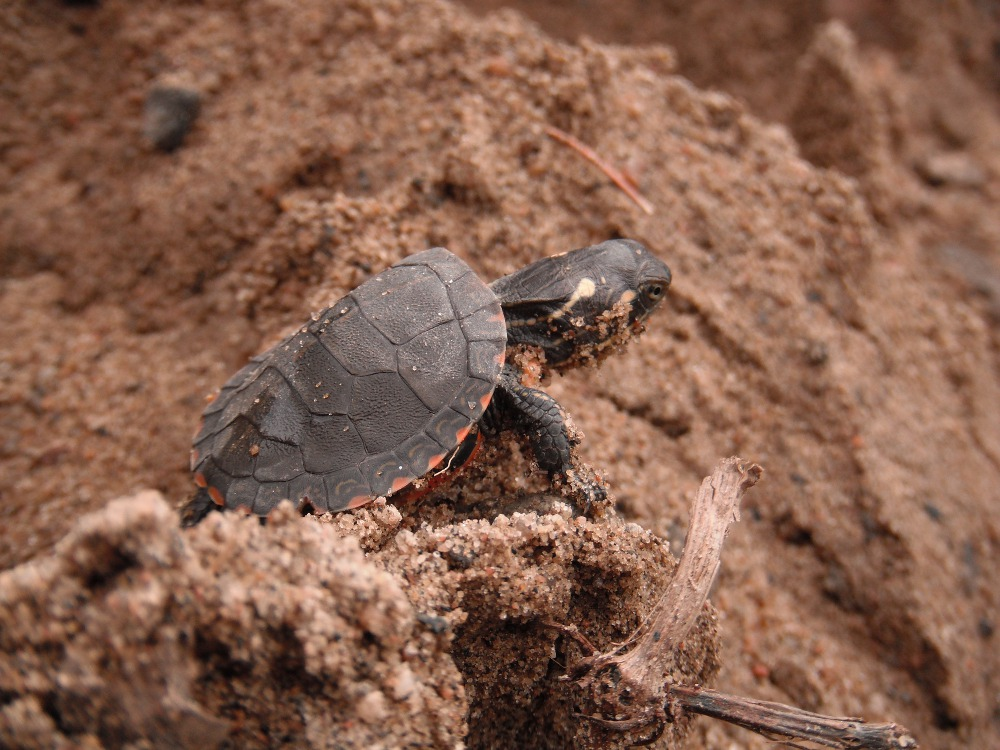
Painted turtle hatchling

Canada has 49 species of reptile, including turtles, lizards and snakes. Of the major groups of reptiles, only crocodiles are absent. Reptile diversity is concentrated in southern Canada, and reptiles are the vertebrate group occurring in the fewest regions of the country.

Most Canadian snakes are members of the colubrid family, including several species of garter snake. Additionally, the western provinces of Alberta and British Columbia have species of pit viper, such as the western rattlesnake, and British Columbia has Canada's only species of boa, the rubber boa.

The painted turtle is among the most widespread Canadian reptiles, occurring discontinuously from British Columbia east to New Brunswick and Nova Scotia.

Marine turtles occur in Canadian waters without nesting there. The Atlantic population of the leatherback sea turtle migrates into the waters off Quebec, New Brunswick, Prince Edward Island, Nova Scotia and Newfoundland and Labrador to forage.

=== Amphibians ===
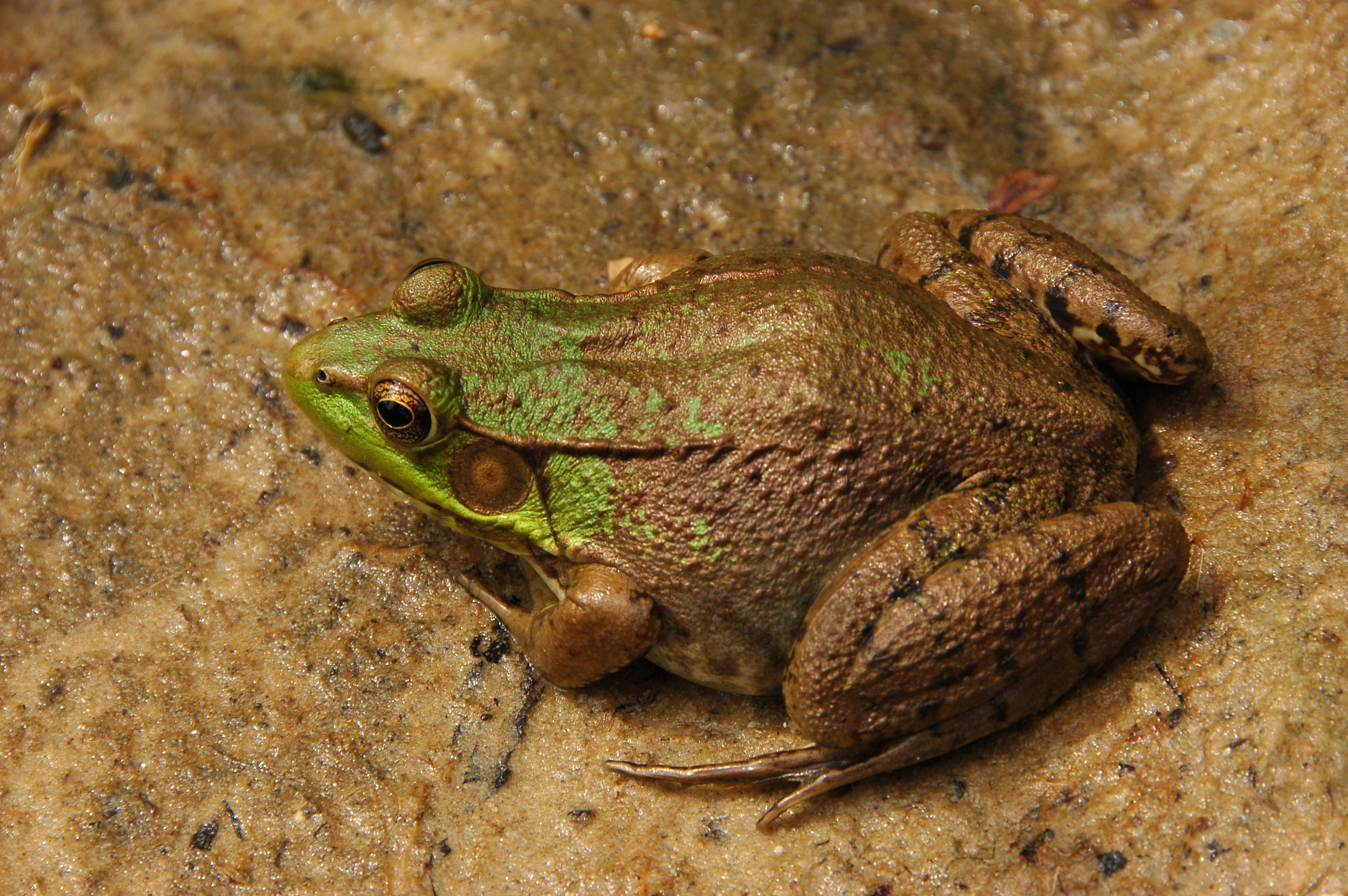
Green frog

Canada has 47 species of amphibian, including salamanders as well as frogs and toads. Amphibians are the only group in the Wild Species 2020 report for which every species could be assigned a conservation rank, reflecting an unusually complete state of knowledge.

Canada's salamanders are found in all ten provinces, but none live in the three northern territories. Notable salamanders of Canada include the common spotted salamander of eastern Canada and the rare pacific giant salamander of British Columbia's coastal rainforest.

Frogs and toads are found in every region of Canada, though more are found in the south. Canada is home to five families of frogs and toads, including the true frogs, true toads, and tree frogs, which are found in every province and territory (except Nunavut, which only has true frogs), the spadefoots, which are found in the prairie provinces, and the tailed frog, which is found only in British Columbia.

=== Fish ===
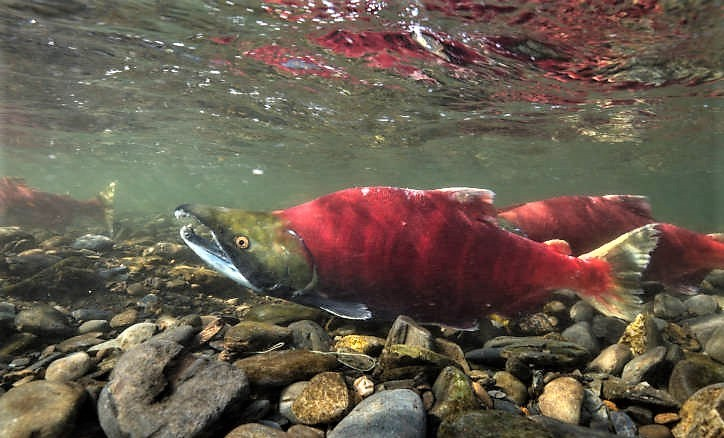
Sockeye salmon

Canada has 1,395 known species of fish, the most of any vertebrate group in the country, although the conservation status of roughly a quarter of them could not be determined for lack of information. Canada's rivers are famous for their annual runs of Atlantic salmon on the east coast and Pacific salmon on the west coast. Canada's many freshwater lakes and streams are home to rainbow trout, Arctic char, and brook trout. In the past, invasive species such as the lamprey and zebra mussel have threatened these native species, and while efforts to combat them have been made they still remain a hazard in some areas, and there is an ongoing effort to prevent the spread of Asian carp from the United States. There are also significant commercial fisheries of many salt-water species, including Atlantic cod, haddock and halibut, although some of these are in decline.

== Invertebrates ==
Invertebrates make up the great majority of Canadian animal diversity, and insects alone account for nearly 70% of the known animal species in the country. Four orders contain most of them: the beetles, the bees, wasps and relatives, the moths and butterflies, and the flies.

The Wild Species 2020 report gives complete Canadian species lists for several of these groups, including 8,238 beetles, 5,430 moths and butterflies, 4,007 true bugs, 903 bees, 702 sawflies, 679 caddisflies, 342 mayflies, 292 stoneflies, 271 grasshoppers and relatives, 219 dragonflies and damselflies and 205 ants. Coverage of the flies remains incomplete, with 5,172 species assessed out of more than 8,000 believed to occur in Canada. Among other terrestrial invertebrates, the report lists 1,439 spiders, 653 water mites, 385 springtails, 138 myriapods, 49 ticks, 38 harvestmen and 24 pseudoscorpions, along with marine and freshwater groups including 416 bivalves, 320 terrestrial and freshwater snails and slugs, 318 decapods, 270 sponges, 152 corals and 100 cephalopods.

A more recent study came up with a total of 44,100 terrestrial arthropods in Canada, estimating that the total national species richness may be on the order of 71,000 to 87,000 species.

Knowledge of these groups lags well behind that of vertebrates. Insufficient information exists to assign a conservation rank to about half of Canada's insect species. Of those that could be ranked, about 84%, or 10,460 species, are secure or apparently secure, while 676 may be at risk of extinction; the groups with the most species at risk are the beetles, with 195, and the moths and butterflies, with 188.

- List of butterflies of Canada
- List of moths of Canada
- List of damselflies of Canada
- List of dragonflies of Canada
- List of earthworms of Canada

== Introduced species ==
Of the species covered by the Wild Species 2020 report, 3,220 are exotic, meaning that they were introduced to Canada, or moved within it, as a result of human activity. The taxonomic groups with the largest numbers of exotic species are the vascular plants, with 1,372, the beetles, with 673, the true bugs, with 443, and the moths and butterflies, with 208. The groups with the highest proportion of exotic species are the earthworms, at 67%, the ticks, at 31%, the vascular plants, at 26%, and the myriapods, at 24%.

== See also ==
- Wildlife of Canada
- Forests of Canada
- List of Wildlife Species at Risk (Canada)
- Invasive species in Canada
- Flora of Canada
