= Protected areas of Canada =

Areas protected for conservation or historical reasons

Protected areas of Canada consist of approximately 12.1 percent of the nation's landmass and freshwater are considered conservation areas, including 11.4 percent designated as protected areas. Approximately 13.8 percent of Canada's territorial waters are conserved, including 8.9 percent designated as protected areas. Terrestrial areas conserved have increased by 65 percent in the 21st century, while marine areas conserved have increased by more than 3,800 percent.

Conservation and protected areas have different mandates depending on the organization which manages them, with some areas having a greater focus on ecological integrity, historical preservation, public usage, scientific research, or a combination of usages. Some areas such as the Polar Bear Pass, are co-managed and overseen by government and local indigenous agencies.

Canada's 18 UNESCO Biosphere Reserves covers a total area of 235,000 square kilometres (91,000 sq mi). Canada's first National Park, Banff National Park established in 1885, spans 6,641 square kilometres (2,564 sq mi) of mountainous terrain, with many glaciers and ice fields, dense coniferous forest, and alpine landscapes. Canada's oldest provincial park, Algonquin Provincial Park established in 1893, covers an area of 7,653.45 square kilometres (2,955.01 sq mi) is dominated by old-growth forest with over 2,400 lakes and 1,200 kilometres of streams and rivers. Lake Superior National Marine Conservation Area is the world's largest freshwater protected area spanning roughly 10,000 square kilometres (3,900 sq mi) of lakebed, its overlaying freshwater, and associated shoreline on 60 square kilometres (23 sq mi) of islands and mainland's. Canada's largest national wildlife region is the Scott Islands Marine National Wildlife Area, which spans 11,570.65 km^{2} (4,467.45 sq mi), protects critical breeding and nesting habitat for over 40 percent of British Columbia's seabirds.

== Legislation ==
Canada established the world's first national park management agency the Dominion Parks Branch now Parks Canada in 1911. In 1916, Canada and the United States signed the Migratory Birds Convention, which regulates the hunting of transcontinental migratory birds under the Migratory Birds Convention Act. The Canada Wildlife Act of 1973 goal is research on wildlife with a focus on larger species. The 1985 Fisheries Act regulates fishing, including the conservation and protection of fish and their spawning grounds. The National Marine Conservation Areas Act established a system of national marine conservation areas in 2002. Canada's Species at Risk Act (SARA) is the federal government legislation to prevent wildlife species from becoming extinct.

== Conservation agencies ==
The primary focus of national parks is to preserve ecological integrity. These parks are administered by Parks Canada. National Marine Conservation Areas, while also under federal control, do not afford the same level of protection. The Canadian Wildlife Service, a division of Environment Canada, manages National Wildlife Areas and Migratory Bird Sanctuaries for the protection of wildlife. A National Wildlife Area protects any land or marine environment within Canadian territorial waters or Canada's Exclusive Economic Zone extending 200 nautical miles (370 km) from the coastline.

Provincial and territorial governments also protect areas within their boundaries. Urban parks in Canada are operated by municipal governments for public recreation and foliage preservation in cities.

Another form of conservation is made by land owners who want to preserve nature for future generations by placing a covenant on their land.

== Lists of conserved areas and sites ==
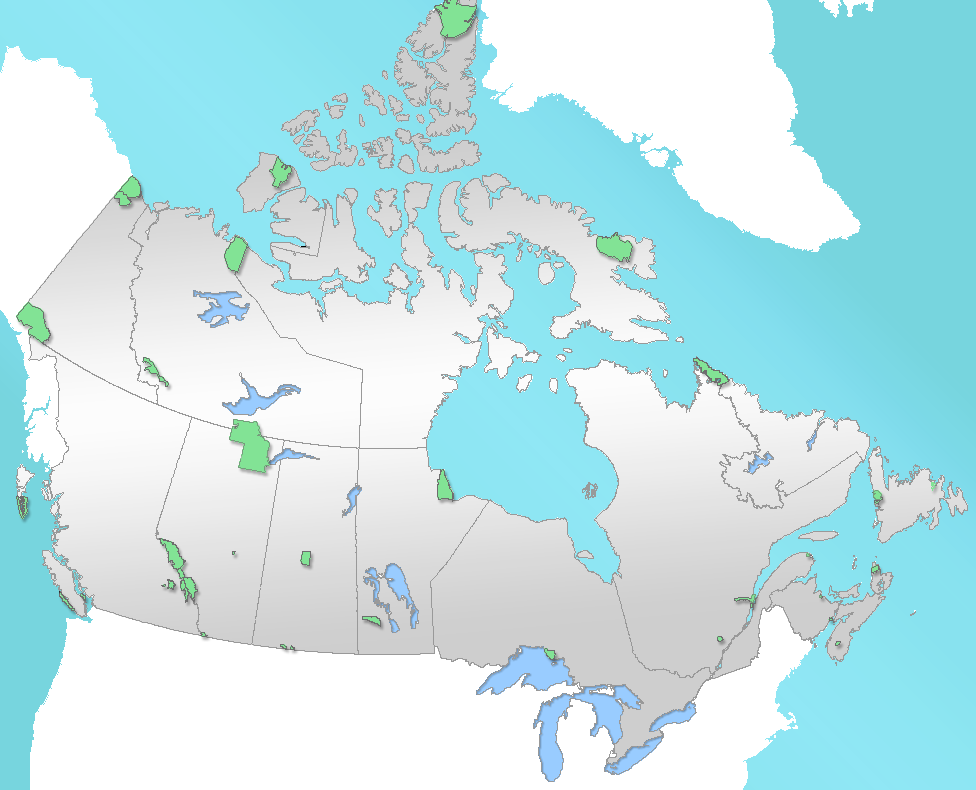
Protected areas by province
- List of Canadian protected areas
- List of National Parks of Canada
- List of National Wildlife Areas in Canada
- List of Migratory Bird Sanctuaries of Canada
- List of UNESCO Biosphere Reserves in Canada
- List of national historic sites of Canada
- List of World Heritage Sites in Canada

== See also ==
- Canadian Parks and Wilderness Society
- Invasive species in Canada
  - Aquatic invasive species in Canada
- List of Wildlife Species at Risk (Canada)
- Wildlife of Canada
