= Wildlife of Canada =

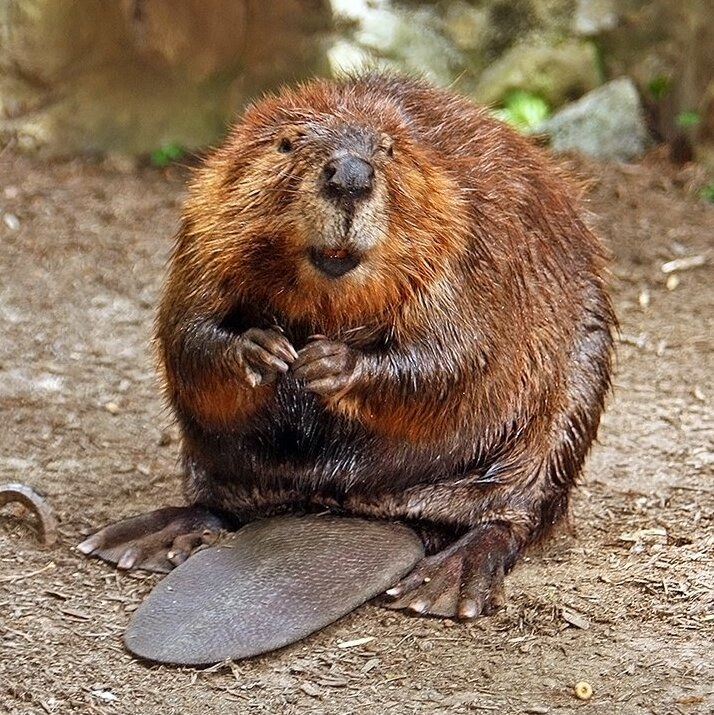
Common North American beaver, official national symbol and one of the most iconic species of Canada's fauna.

The wildlife of Canada or biodiversity of Canada consist of over 80,000 classified species, (Note: "80,000 known species in Canada, excluding viruses and bacteria") and an equal number thought yet to be recognized. Known fauna and flora have been identified from five kingdoms: protozoa represent approximately 1% of recorded species; chromist (approximately 4%); fungi (approximately 16%); plants (approximately 11%); and animals (approximately 68%). Insects account for nearly 70 percent of documented animal species in Canada. More than 300 species are found exclusively in Canada.

There are 20 major ecosystems – ecozones – in Canada: 15 terrestrial and 5 marine. Canada's major biomes are the tundra, boreal forest, grassland, and temperate deciduous forest. Since the end of the last glacial period, Canada has consisted of eight distinct forest regions, with approximately half of its land area covered by forests (roughly 8 percent of the world's forested land).

Due to human activities, invasive species and environmental issues in the country, there are currently more than 800 species at risk of being lost. Over 1400 invasive species of fish, plants, insects and invertebrates have been introduced to Canada through intentional and unintentional means. About 65 percent of Canada's resident species are considered secure. Protected and conservation areas have been established to preserve and restore Canadian flora and fauna species. Approximately 5000 Canadian animal species and 30,000 Canadian plant species are restricted from export for international trade.

== Biodiversity ==
=== Habitat ===
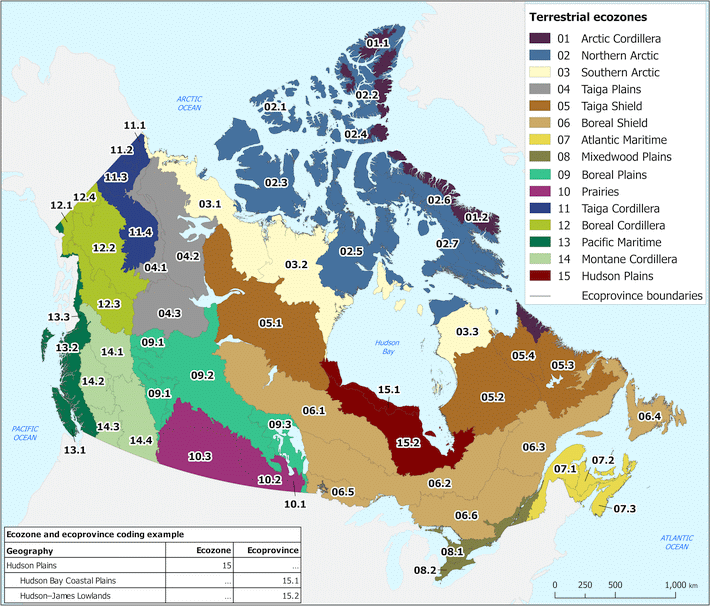
Canada's 15 terrestrial ecozones are further subdivided into 53 ecoprovinces, 194 ecoregions, and 1,027 ecodistricts.

Canada is characterized by a wide range of both meteorologic and geological regions that are divided into fifteen terrestrial and five marine ecozones, such as the forests of British Columbia and Central Canada, the prairies of Western Canada, the tundra of Northern Canada, and the marine ecosystems of the Arctic, Atlantic Canada and Pacific coast. The largest marine ecozone is the Arctic Archipelago (which covers about 15 percent of Canada, or 1.5 million km2), whereas the largest terrestrial ecozone is the Boreal Shield (covering 20 percent of Canada, or 1.9 million km^{2}).

Canada's major biomes are the tundra, boreal forest, grassland, and temperate deciduous forest. British Columbia has a multitude of smaller biomes, including: a subalpine forest which extends into Alberta, a temperate rainforest along the coast, a semi arid desert located in the Okanagan Valley and alpine tundra in the higher mountainous regions.

Over half of Canada's landscape is intact and relatively free of human development. The boreal forest of Canada is considered to be the largest intact forest on earth, with around 300,000 square kilometres (120,000 sq mi) undisturbed by roads, cities or industry. The Canadian Arctic tundra is the second-largest vegetation region in the country consisting of dwarf shrubs, sedges and grasses, mosses and lichens. The Canadian Prairies a temperate grassland with shrubland and northern mixed grasslands are used for rearing livestock and cultivating crops. Only seven percent of Canada's land is suitable for large scale agricultural production.

Canada has over 2,000,000 lakes—563 greater than 100 square kilometres (39 sq mi)—which is more than any other country hosting a multitude of unique ecosystems. Canada is home to about twenty five percent (134.6 million ha) of the world's wetlands that support a vast array of local ecosystems. Canada's waterways have their own ecosystems; with the two longest rivers being the Mackenzie River, that begins at Great Slave Lake and ends in the Arctic Ocean, with its drainage basin covering a large part of northwestern Canada, and the Saint Lawrence River, which drains the Great Lakes into the Gulf of St. Lawrence ending in the Atlantic Ocean. The Mackenzie, including its tributaries is over 4,200 square kilometres (1,600 sq mi) in length and lies within the second largest drainage basin of North America, while the St. Lawrence 3,058 square kilometres (1,181 sq mi) in length, drains the world's largest system of freshwater lakes.

=== Fauna ===
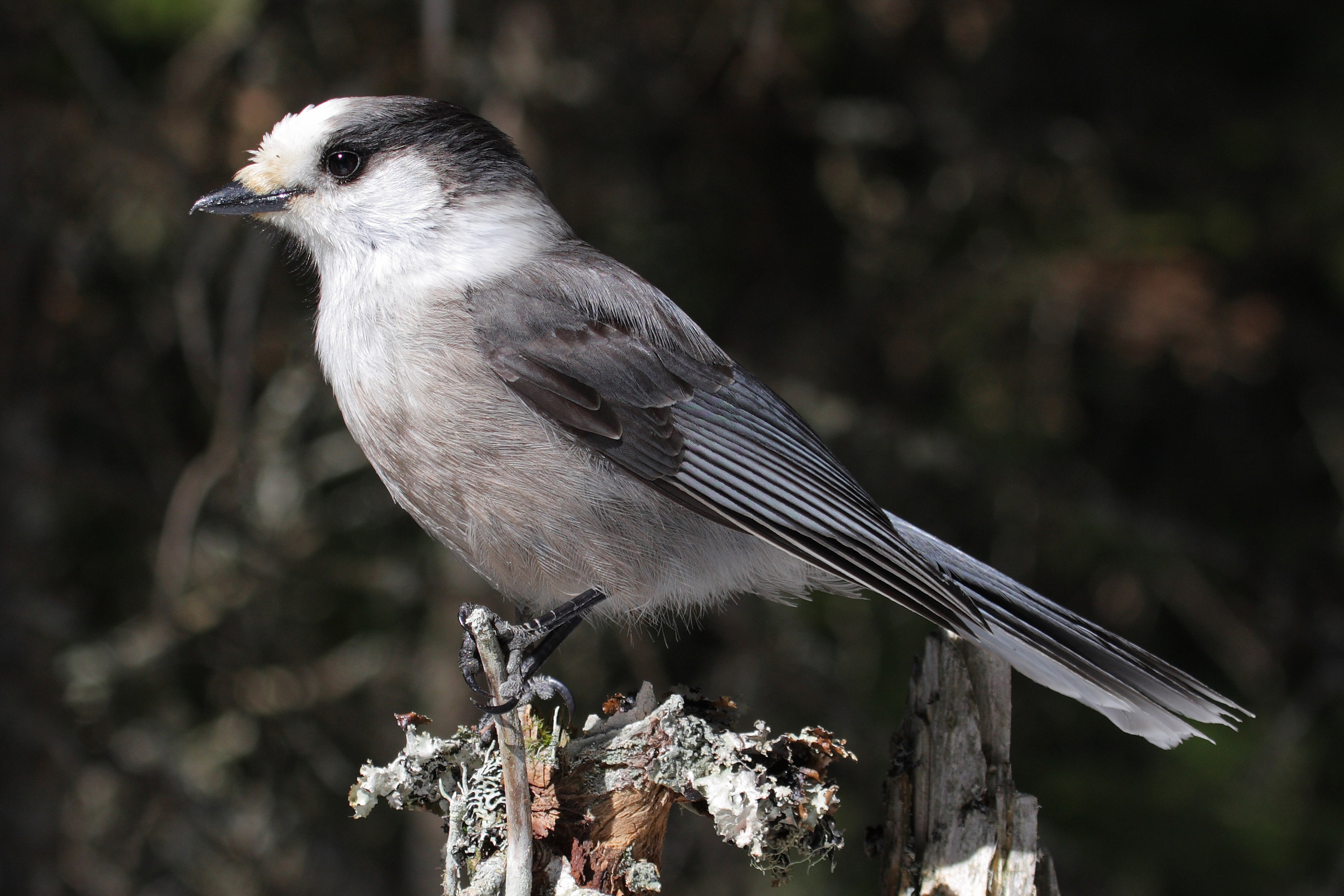
The Canada jay is found in the boreal forest north to the tree line, and in the Rocky Mountains subalpine zone.

There are approximately 200 mammal species, over 460 bird species, over 40 amphibian species, over 40 reptile species, and over 1,200 fish species in Canada. Invertebrates present include 55,000 species of insects and 11,000 species of mites and spiders.

The Great Lakes region is home to the black bear, Virginia opossum, American red squirrel, North American beaver, and striped skunk; birds include eastern bluebird, red-winged blackbird, robin, wood thrush, woodpecker, oriole, bobolink, crow, hawk, bittern, heron, black duck, and loon. The boreal forest region contains moose, caribou, Canada lynx, timber wolf, marten, porcupine, snowshoe hare, and chipmunk. The Rocky Mountain region fauna included the grizzly bear, mountain goat, bighorn sheep, elk, cougar, and flying squirrel.

The Pacific ecozone is home to the mountain goat, mountain beaver, a vast variety of mice, and striped skunk; birds include northern pygmy-owl, band-tailed pigeon, black swift, northern flicker, crow, rufous-sided towhee, and black brant. Residence species of the Great Plains ecoregion includes the desert cottontail, deer mouse gophers, plains bison, and several types of prairie dogs (black-tailed, white-tailed, and gunnison's), alongside many prairie birds. The Arctic expanse includes fauna such as the musk ox and reindeer, polar bear, and Arctic fox, arctic hare, and lemming; with birds such as the snowy owl, willow ptarmigan, snow bunting and arctic tern.

Walrus, dolphins, seals, sea turtles, whales and sharks inhabit Canada's coastal waters. Seal species include harbor seal, harp seal, hooded seal, grey seal, bearded seal, northern fur seal, northern elephant seal, ringed seal, Steller sea lion, and California sea lion among others. Salt-water fish including the Atlantic cod, Pacific salmon, hake, haddock and halibut; alongside crustaceans such as lobster, snow crab and shrimp are the primary commercial species. Walleye (AKA pickerel), northern pike, rainbow trout, largemouth bass and the black crappie are common fresh-water fish species found throughout the country. Canada hosts many amphibian, including salamanders as well as frogs and toads and many species of reptile, including turtles, lizards, and snakes.

Many of North America's migratory birds, including songbirds, waterfowl and shorebirds, take up residence in Canada during the spring and summer. In addition to native and migratory mammals, many Eurasian mammals were introduced to Canada either intentionally or accidentally. Among them are domestic mammals, such as the horse, pig, sheep, dog, cat, and cattle, and wild mammals, such as the brown rat and the house mouse.

=== Flora ===
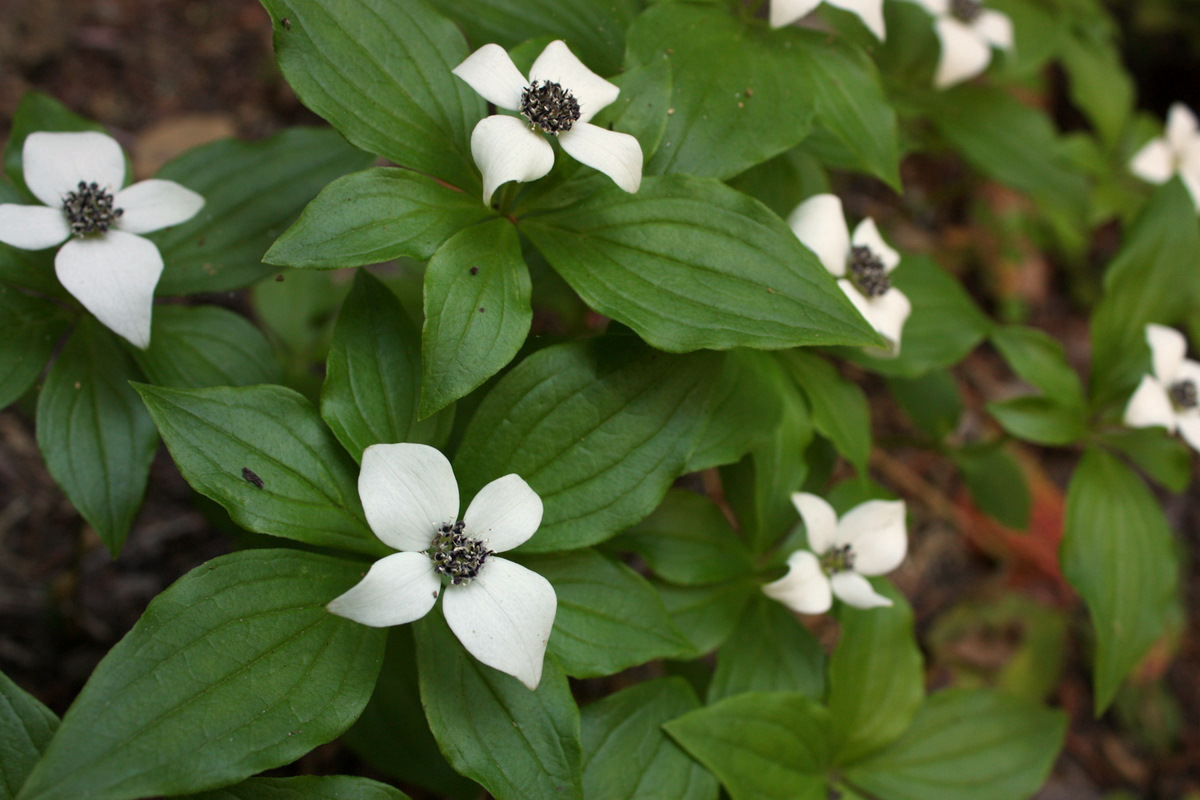
The Canadian bunchberry is found in montane ecosystems and boreal forests, where it grows along the margins of moist woods.

Since the end of the last glacial period, Canada has consisted of eight distinct forest regions. According to Environment and Climate Change Canada, the nation hosts approximately 17,000 identified species of trees, flowers, herbs, ferns, mosses and other flora. Approximately 95 percent of the vascular plants in Canada are of the flowering variety. Roughly half of Canada is covered by forest, totalling around 2.4 millionkm^{2} (0.93 millionsq mi). Over 90% of Canada's forests are owned by the public (crown land, and the majority being provincial forests). About half of the forests are allocated for logging.

The Great Lakes region flora includes white pine, hemlock and red maples, yellow birch, and beech trees. The Maritimes region is dominated by the red spruce, while the black spruce is prevalent in the eastern Laurentian, with spruce in the western Laurentian. The balsam fir, white cedar tamarack, white birch, and aspen and jack pine are also found in the eastern portion of the country. The tundra is home to the aspen, bur oak, balm of Gilead, cottonwood and balsam poplar.

The west coast has the western hemlock, red cedar, Douglas fir, Sitka spruce, and western white pine being dominate. The Rocky Mountain region consistent of alpine fir, Engelmann spruce, lodgepole pine and mountain hemlock. Other native plants seen across Canada include; American ginseng, trillium cernuum, red bearberry, bog Labrador tea, purple prairie clover, sand cherry, Pallas' wallflower, little evening primrose, showy orchis and common eelgrass.

== Species at risk ==
The black-footed ferret is listed as endangered primarily as a result of decreases in prairie dog populations and sylvatic plague.

Canada's Species at Risk Act (SARA) is the federal government legislation to prevent wildlife species from becoming extinct. The goal of the act is to protect endangered or threatened organisms. Provinces, territories and large municipalities also have their own species and habitat conservation regulations.

Although Canada has a low percentage of endemic species compared to other countries; pollution, loss of biodiversity, over-exploitation of commercial species, invasive species and habitat loss have threatened many species. More than 800 species are listed as being at risk of extinction, including 363 classified as endangered species, —190 threatened species, —235 special concern, and 22 extirpated (no longer found in the wild).

In addition to the extirpated species, at least 19 have become completely extinct, with 30 species no longer found in Canada. These include the Dawson's caribou, sea mink, great auk, Labrador duck, passenger pigeon, deepwater cisco, longjaw cisco, Banff longnose dace, and blue walleye.

Species at risk include the Canada lynx, polar bear, sea otter, wolverine, black-footed ferret, northern fur seal, steller sea lion, hooded seal, North Atlantic right whale, sei whale and whooping crane.

== Invasive species ==
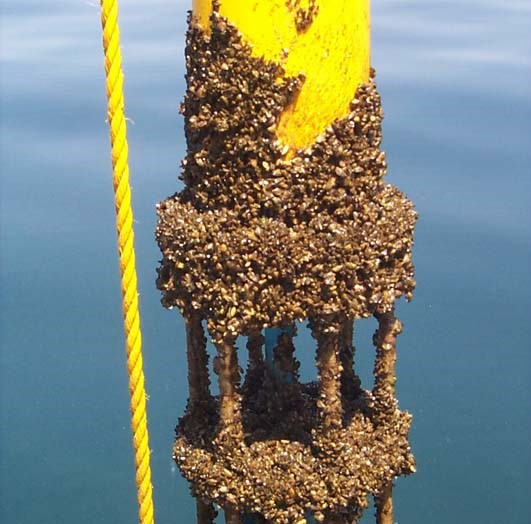
Zebra mussels were first detected in the Great Lakes Basin in 1988, in Lake St. Clair.

Over 1400 invasive species of fish, plants, insects and invertebrates have been introduced to Canada through intentional and unintentional means. Over 450 invasive flora and over 400 invasive insects have been identified. The Great Lakes region is home to nearly 200 invasive species, making it one of Canada's most heavily affected ecosystems. Freshwater ecosystems are disproportionately more imperilled compared to terrestrial ecosystems.

Invasive species such as the sea lamprey, zebra mussels, European green crab, the mountain pine beetle, round goby, Asian long-horned beetle, emerald ash borer, didymo, spongy moth, and Asian carp have altered local habitats and caused essential ecosystems to decline or fail, driving native species towards extinction.

The most invasive flora species are the purple loosestrife, yellow iris, dog-strangling vine, knapweed, and leafy spurge. The fungi causing Dutch elm disease is another notable invasive. These species can spread aggressively, outcompete native wild vegetation and overwhelm agricultural crops.

== Conservation ==
Approximately 12.1 percent of the nation's landmass and freshwater are considered conservation areas, including 11.4 percent designated as protected areas. Approximately 13.8 percent of Canada's territorial waters are conserved, including 8.9 percent designated as protected areas. Terrestrial areas conserved have increased by 65 percent in the 21st century, while marine areas conserved have increased by more than 3,800 percent. Conservation and protected areas have different mandates depending on the organization which manages them, with some areas having a greater focus on ecological integrity, historical preservation, public usage, scientific research, or a combination of usages. Some regions within Canada's largest conserved areas are heavily commercialized featuring grand buildings such as the Banff Springs Hotel and Chateau Lake Louise.

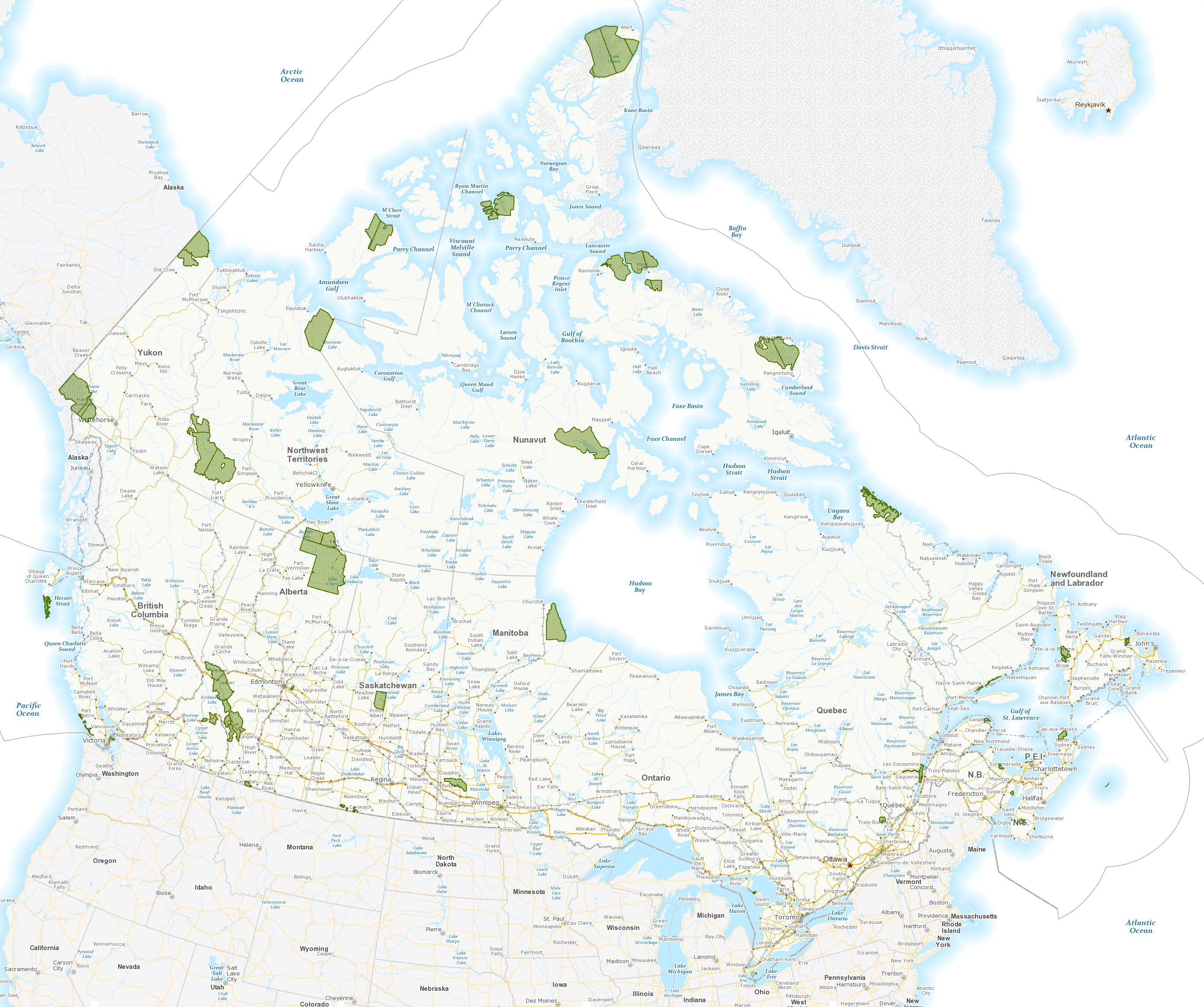
Canada's national parks and national reserves by provinces and territories

Canada established the world's first national park management agency the Dominion Parks Branch now Parks Canada in 1911. In 1916, Canada and the United States signed the Migratory Birds Convention, which regulates the hunting of transcontinental migratory birds under the Migratory Birds Convention Act. The Canada Wildlife Act of 1973 goal is research on wildlife with a focus on larger species. The 1985 Fisheries Act regulates fishing, including the conservation and protection of fish and their spawning grounds. The National Marine Conservation Areas Act established a system of national marine conservation areas in 2002.

The primary focus of the Canadian national parks system is to preserve ecological integrity. National Marine Conservation Areas, while also under federal control, do not afford the same level of protection. The Canadian Wildlife Service, a division of Environment and Climate Change Canada, manages the National Wildlife Areas and Migratory Bird Sanctuaries for the protection of wildlife. Provincial and territorial governments also protect areas within their boundaries. Urban parks in Canada are operated by municipal governments for public recreation and foliage preservation in cities. Some areas such as the Polar Bear Pass, are co-managed and overseen by government and local indigenous agencies.

Canada's 18 UNESCO Biosphere Reserves covers a total area of 235,000 square kilometres (91,000 sq mi). Canada's first national park, Banff National Park established in 1885, spans 6,641 square kilometres (2,564 sq mi) of mountainous terrain, with many glaciers and ice fields, dense coniferous forest, and alpine landscapes. Canada's oldest provincial park, Algonquin Provincial Park established in 1893, covers an area of 7,653.45 square kilometres (2,955.01 sq mi) is dominated by old-growth forest with over 2,400 lakes and 1,200 kilometers of streams and rivers. Lake Superior National Marine Conservation Area is the world's largest freshwater protected area spanning roughly 10,000 square kilometres (3,900 sq mi) of lakebed, its overlaying freshwater, and associated shoreline on 60 square kilometres (23 sq mi) of islands and mainland's. Canada's largest national wildlife region is the Scott Islands Marine National Wildlife Area, which spans 11,570.65 square kilometres (4,467.45 sq mi), protects critical breeding and nesting habitat for over 40 percent of British Columbia's seabirds.

== National wildlife symbols ==
Canada does not have a floral emblem or bird emblem at the national level.

Symbol	Image	Notes
Maple leaf	Maple leaf	Perhaps the most prominent symbol of Canada has been a de facto symbol since the 1700s
National flag		Official symbol as of February 15, 1965 features a stylized, red, 11-pointed maple leaf charged in the centre.
National tree	Maple	Official symbol since 1996.
National animals	Beaver	Official symbol since 1975.
National animals	Canadian horse	Official symbol since 2002.

== Provincial and territorial wildlife symbols ==
Canadian provinces and territories have a variety of official fauna, flora and organic matter based on the biodiversity of the area.

Flower	Area	Plant	Tree	Mammal	Bird	Fish	Other
	Alberta	Prickly wild rose (Rosa acicularis)	Lodgepole pine	Rocky Mountain bighorn sheep	Great horned owl	Bull trout	Rough fescue (grass)
	British Columbia	Pacific dogwood (Cornus nuttallii)	Western red cedar (Thuja plicata)	Spirit bear (Kermode bear, Ursus americanus kermodei)	Steller's jay (Cyanacitta dtelleri)	Pacific salmon	
	Manitoba	Prairie crocus (Pulsatilla patens)	White spruce (Picea glauca)	American bison (Bison bison)	Great gray owl (Strix nebulosa)	Walleye	Big bluestem (grass)
	Newfoundland and Labrador	Purple pitcher plant (Sarracenia purpurea)	Black spruce	Newfoundland dog	Atlantic puffin		
	Nova Scotia	Mayflower (Epigaea repens)	Red spruce (Picea rubens)	Nova Scotia duck tolling retriever dog Provincial horse: Sable Island horse	Osprey (Pandion haliaetus)		Wild blueberry
	New Brunswick	Purple violet	Balsam fir		Black-capped chickadee		Holmesville Soil
	Ontario	Trillium (Trillium grandiflorum)	Eastern white pine (Pinus strobus linnaeus)		Common loon (Gavia immer)		
	Prince Edward Island	Lady's slipper (Cypripedium acaule)	Red oak (Quercus rubra)		Blue jay (Cyanocitta cristata)		Charlottetown soil
	Quebec	Blue flag iris	Yellow birch		Snowy owl		
	Saskatchewan	Western red lily	White birch	White-tailed deer	Sharp-tailed grouse	Walleye	Needle-and-thread grass Saskatoon berry
	Northwest Territories	Mountain avens	Tamarack (Larix laricina)		Gyrfalcon (Falco rusticolus)	Arctic grayling (Thymallus arcticus)	
	Nunavut	Purple saxifrage		Canadian Inuit Dog	Rock ptarmigan		
	Yukon	Fireweed (Epilobium angustifolium)	Subalpine fir (Abies lasiocarpa)		Raven (Corvus corax)		

== See also ==
- List of botanical gardens in Canada
- List of Canadian protected areas
- List of national parks of Canada
- List of National Wildlife Areas in Canada
- List of Migratory Bird Sanctuaries of Canada
- List of UNESCO Biosphere Reserves in Canada
- National Historic Sites of Canada
- List of World Heritage Sites in Canada

Overlapping ecosystems

- Fauna of the United States
- Flora of the United States
- Invasive species in the United States
