= Invasive species in Canada =

Non-native organisms including plants, animals, insects, viruses, fungi, and pathogens

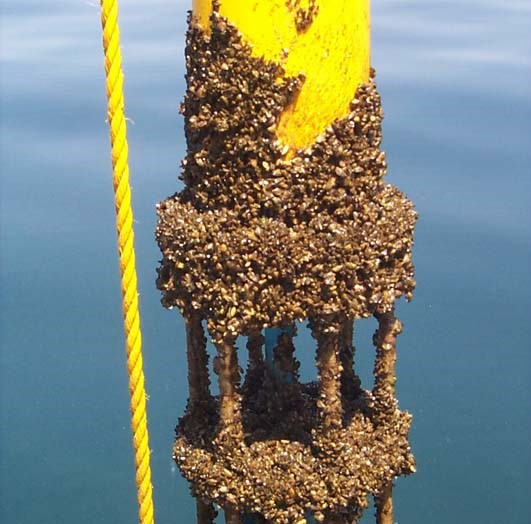
Zebra mussels were first detected in the Great Lakes Basin in 1988, in Lake St. Clair.

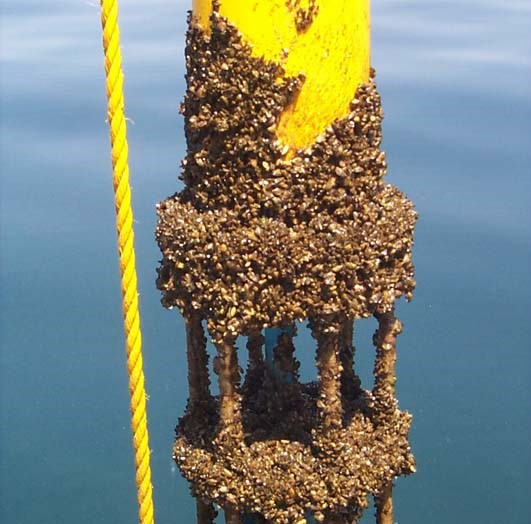
Zebra mussels were first detected in the Great Lakes Basin in 1988, in Lake St. Clair.

Invasive species in Canada are non-native organisms including plants, animals, insects, viruses, fungi, and pathogens that have the potential to cause harm within various ecosystems due to their general adaptability and ability to outcompete native species for immediate resources such as food, habitat, and nutrient availability.

Over 1400 invasive species of fish, plants, insects and invertebrates have been introduced to Canada through intentional and unintentional means. Over 450 invasive flora and over 400 invasive insects have been identified. The Great Lakes region is home to nearly 200 invasive species, making it one of Canada's most heavily affected ecosystems. Freshwater ecosystems are disproportionately more imperilled compared to terrestrial ecosystems.

Most invasive species are introduced and moved around through human activities such as the transportation of shipping vessels and other marine vehicles, the movement of firewood, as well as through the horticultural industry. The regulation of these pests is managed on a provincial and federal level; It is the responsibility of each province/territory to monitor the spread of invasive species.

While ecological invasion is a naturally occurring phenomenon, anthropogenic activities have increased the occurrence and scale of invasions. The spread of invasive species is increasing due to habitat fragmentation, climate change, increased global trade and mobility. Invasive species are one of the top drivers of biodiversity loss globally, only second to habitat loss. Significant ecological, economic, and environmental damage can occur due to invasive species spread.

== Impacts ==
Invasive species cause significant damage and pose threats to Canadian agriculture, forestry, commercial fishery, recreation, culture, and biodiversity.

=== Economic Impacts ===
Invasive species have economic impacts across animal production, arts and recreation, construction, crop production, forestry, hunting, mining, private households, public administration, transportation, and utilities. In 2004, it was estimated that the annual cost for 16 invasive species was between CAD $13.3 and $34.5 billion annually. Leafy spurge, for example, has cost the province of Manitoba $19 million in treatment costs annually.

=== Environmental Impacts ===
Environmental impacts include ecosystem diversity, structure and function, displacement of native species, and endangering other species at risk. Ecosystem functioning can also be altered through the spread of invasive plants through changes in carbon sequestration and dense canopies that shade undergrowth.

==== Pacific & Western Canada ====
In Western Canada, the ecological impacts of invasive species are increasingly intersecting with changing climate patterns, particularly through the amplification of wildfire cycles. Invasive flora fundamentally alters local fuel loads and forest compositions, transforming vulnerable ecosystems into volatile fire hazards. Invasive plants significantly modify regional fire regimes by changing the density, structure, and flammability of ground cover. For example, the rapid colonization of cheatgrass (Bromus tectorum) across dry interior ranges in British Columbia introduces a highly flammable, continuous fine fuel bed. Cheatgrass dries out much earlier in the summer season than native perennial bunchgrasses, creating a continuous carpet of fine kindling that accelerates fire ignition and increases the rate of spread across provincial rangelands.

Similarly, densely growing wood-heavy invasive species like Scotch broom (Cytisus scoparius) pose a significant wildfire hazard as they act as fuel ladders. According to data tracked by the BC Ministry of Forests, Scotch broom actively invades recently cleared forest stands and resource corridors, altering soil chemistry and compounding fire behavior and control concerns. Because of its high oil content, dry branch architecture, and capacity to form dense, impenetrable thickets, it functions as a volatile flash fuel in coastal areas like Vancouver Island and the Lower Mainland. These structural attributes allow low-intensity ground fires to climb easily into the forest canopy, dramatically elevating the likelihood of destructive crown fires and complicating suppression efforts by regional fire services.

== Invasive Species Strategy ==
In 2004 the federal government of Canada released their invasive alien species strategy. Four key priorities for establishing an invasive species management strategy; prevention, early detection, rapid response, and management.

=== Prevention ===
Prevention of invasive species introduction includes conducting comprehensive risk analysis for planned introductions and measures to reduce unintentional introductions. There are many strategies for preventing unintentional invasions including the play clean go strategy: removing dirt and plant matter from boots and gear after outdoor activities and staying on designated trails. The buy local burn local strategy encourages the use of buying firewood where you plan to burn it to prevent the unintentional spread of tree-killing insects and pathogens. In addition, the plant wise strategy encourages gardening and landscaping with native or non-invasive fauna and flora to prevent the unintentional spread of invasives.

=== Early Detection ===
Early detection through large-scale surveillance is a key step in effective management of invasive species. It involves site specific monitoring around critical points of entry, and protected areas and can be done through government bodies, non-governmental organizations, or citizen science. Once an unknown species has been reported, it can be identified and a determination of rapid response and management can be done. Early detection is often low due to logistic and financial feasibility that limits the strength of detection programs.

Invasive plants can be hard to identify in the early stages of growth resulting in their ability to establish strong populations before they have been detected. The evolvement of technologies like remote sensing, environmental DNA, and artificial intelligence have improved the capabilities for early detection and response given their ability to detect new species in earlier stages. Crowdsourcing through citizen science can also enhance early detection programs.

=== Rapid Response ===
Rapid response is a systematic effort to eradicate or contain invasive species while infestations are still localized. Integrated risk analysis is used to determine appropriate rapid response measures when an invasive species is identified. Systems for rapid decision-making and implementation are essential for responding before a species can become established or cause harm. Early and rapid responses are more likely to be effective than control or eradication attempts occurring later in established colonies.

=== Management ===
Eradication, containment, control and public awareness are strategies used for management of invasive species. Management can be undertaken through multiple methods including chemical, biological, or physical control. Chemical control is the use of pesticides, herbicides, fungicides or insecticides, this strategy involves proper application to ensure application is limited to the appropriate area to prevent damage to other species. Biological control is when another living organism is used to control or eradicate an invasive species, usually this involved the introduction of the invasive species' natural predator to contain the spread. This method does run the risk of introducing additional invasive species or other unintended consequences if the other organism is not thoroughly assessed and monitored. Mechanical or physical control involves many methods including hand-pulling, digging, flooding, installing physical barriers, prescribed burns, girdling, mowing. Physical control is typically labour intensive and is most effective for small colonies or in conjunction with other methods. Public participation can also support management strategies through individual-scale actions and volunteer-based initiatives.

== Government goals and targets ==
=== 2020 Biodiversity Goals and Targets ===
In 2015, the 2020 Biodiversity Goals and Targets were adopted by Canada with 19 targets to protect Canada's nature and biodiversity. Goal B was to reduce the pressures on biodiversity and create more sustainable consumption of biological resorces. Target 11 within goal B specifically addressed invasive alien species with the stated goal of developing management plans:

"By 2020, pathways of invasive alien species introductions are identified, and risk-based intervention or management plans are in place for priority pathways and species."

Indicators of the target were the number of known invasive alien species in Canada, percentage of federally regulated unestablished invasive species, and the number of intervention or management plans in place. In the 2020 final assessment, the target was met based on pathways of introduction being identified and management strategies in place for priority pathways and species.

=== 2030 Nature Strategy ===
After signing the 2022 Kunming-Montreal Global Biodiversity Framework, the 2030 Nature Strategy was introduced to provide a path forward for how Canada will implement the framework.

Target 6 on Invasive Alien Species of Canada's 2030 Nature strategy is to

"Eliminate, minimize, reduce and or mitigate the impacts of invasive alien species on biodiversity and ecosystem services by identifying and managing pathways of the introduction of alien species, preventing the introduction and establishment of priority invasive alien species, reducing the rates of introduction and establishment of other known or potential invasive alien species by at least 50 per cent by 2030, and eradicating or controlling invasive alien species, especially in priority sites, such as islands."

This target builds off of the existing pathways and management plans created through the 2020 Biodiversity Goals and Targets.

== Indigenous Perspectives and Management ==
As stewards of the land and water, Indigenous peoples' knowledge and experience of the land can be integrated into invasive species management for a more nuanced and wholistic approach to management.

Invasive species management is typically focused on eradication through removal and management. Some Indigenous perspectives instead choose to look at the reasons invasions become present and what sort of relationship can be created with humans and the land.

One Anishinaabe perspective focuses on the idea that every plant and animal is kin, this relational approach looks for benefits of invasive plants instead of focusing on their removal. They view the arrival of new species as a natural form of migration and seek to discover the purpose of said migration. Garlic mustard, for example, is an invasive plant from Europe that hinders growth of native plants, an alternative management response could be to use it as a foraged herb.

In the Chilcotin region of British Columbia, the Indigenous Tsilhqot’in people offer a different perspective on the wild horse populations that are considered invasive by the provincial government. The Xeni Gwet’in recognize the need to respect the animals and instead of considering if the horses should be on the land, they focus on the different relationships the horses have within the ecological system.

== Terrestrial species ==
Terrestrial species are those that have evolved to sustain life on land. Terrestrial invasive species often have the potential to harm environments such as agricultural fields, young and old-growth forests, waterways, and other sensitive ecosystems.

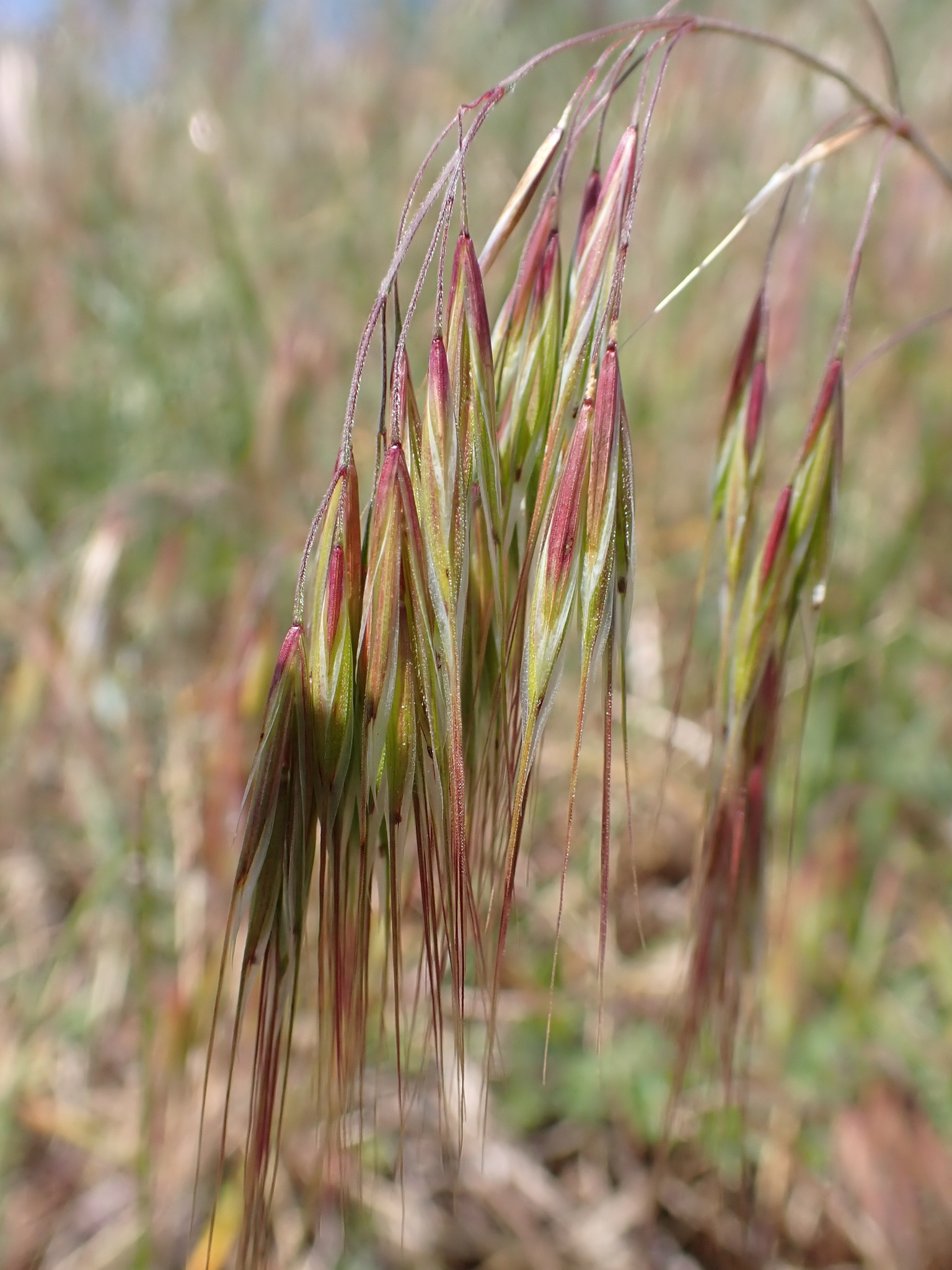
Cheatgrass (Bromus tectorum) has invaded the arid rangelands of interior British Columbia, increasing both the frequency and intensity of wildfires while simultaneously destroying fire-resistant native bunchgrass ecosystems.

=== Plants ===
- Aegilops cylindrica - Jointed goatgrass
- Alopecurus myosuroides - Slender foxtail
- Arundo donax - Giant reed
- Berberis ssp. - Barberry
- Bromus tectorum - Cheatgrass
- Centaurea iberica - Iberian starthistle
- Centaurea solstitialis - Yellow starthistle
- Centaurea stoebe - Spotted knapweed
- Crupina vulgaris - Common crupina
- Cuscuta ssp. - Dodder
- Cytisus scoparius - Scotch Broom
- Dioscorea polystachya - Chinese yam
- Echium plantagineum - Paterson's curse
- Eriochloa villosa - Wooly cup grass
- Heracleum mantegazzianum - Giant Hogweed
- Jacobaea vulgaris - Tansy Ragwort
- Mahoberberis ssp. - Barberry
- Mahonia ssp. - Barberry
- Microstegium vimineum - Japanese stiltgrass
- Nassella trichotoma - Serrated tussock
- Orobanche ssp. - Broomrape
- Paspalum dilatatum - Dallis grass
- Persicaria perfoliata - Mile-a-minute, Devil's-tail tearthumb
- Persicaria wallichii - Himalayan Knotweed
- Phragmites australis - Common reed
- Pueraria montana - Kudzu
- Reynoutria japonica - Japanese Knotweed
- Reynoutria sachalinensis - Giant Knotweed
- Reynoutria × bohemica - Bohemian Knotweed
- Senecio inaequidens - South African ragwort
- Senecio madagascariensis - Madagascar ragwort
- Solanum elaeagnifolium - Silverleaf nightshade
- Striga ssp - Witchweed
- Zygophyllum fabago - Syrian bean-caper

=== Invertebrates ===
==== Insects ====
- Acrobasis pyrivorella - Pear fruit moth
- Acropolitis rudisana - Leafroller caterpillar
- Adelges tsugae - Hemlock wooly adelgid
- Adoxophyes orana - Summer fruit tortrix moth
- Agrilus planipennis - Emerald ash borer
- Anoplophora spp. - Longhorned beetle
- Anthonomus bisignifer - Japanese strawberry blossom weevil
- Aphanostigma iaksuiense - Powdery pear aphid
- Archips breviplicanus - Asiatic leafroller
- Argyrotaenia ljungiana - Eurasian fruit roller moth
- Aromia bungii - Red-necked longhorn beetle
- Cacoecimorpha pronubana - Carnation tortrix
- Cacopsylla chinensis - Chinese pear psylla
- Cacopsylla liaoli - Liaoning pear psylla
- Callipogon relictus - Longhorned beetle
- Carposina sasakii - Peach fruit moth
- Conogethes punctiferalis - Yellow peach moth
- Cydalima perspectalis - Box tree moth
- Cydia pomonella - Codling moth
- Diaspidiotus pyri - Pear scale, San Jose scale
- Epiphyas postvittana - Light brown apple moth
- Eupoecilia ambiguella - European grape berry moth
- Grapholita dimorpha - Oriental plum fruit moth
- Grapholita funebrana - Plum fruit moth
- Grapholita inopinata - Manchurian fruit moth
- Grapholita lobarzewskii - Small fruit tortrix
- Grapholita molesta - Oriental fruit moth
- Hylastes ater - Black pine bark beetle
- Halyomorpha halys - Brown Marmorated Stink Bug
- Ips typographus - European spruce bark beetle
- Leptinotarsa decemlineata - Colorado potato beetle
- Leucoptera malifoliella - Pear leaf blister moth
- Linepithema humile - Argentine Ant
- Lobesia botrana - European grapevine moth
- Lycorma delicatula - Spotted lanternfly
- Lymantria albescens - Okinawa spongy moth, Okinawa gypsy moth (complex species)
- Lymantria dispar - Spongy moth, gypsy moth
- Lymantria dispar asiatica - Asian spongy moth, Asian gypsy moth (complex species)
- Lymantria dispar japonica - Japanese spongy moth, Japanese gypsy moth (complex species)
- Lymantria mathura - Rosy spongy moth, rosy gypsy moth (complex species)
- Lymantria monacha - Black arches, nun moth (complex species)
- Lymantria postalba - Asian spongy moth, Asian gypsy moth (complex species)
- Lymantria umbrosa - Asian spongy moth, Asian gypsy moth (complex species)
- Mamestra brassicae - Cabbage moth, cabbage armyworm
- Monochamus ssp. - Boring beetles
- Myrmica rubra - European Fire Ant
- Naupactus xanthographus - Fruit tree weevil
- Nippoptilia vitis - Grape plume moth
- Nysius vinitor - Rutherglen bug
- Operophtera brumata - Winter moth
- Orgyia anartoides - Painted apple moth
- Otiorhynchus ligustici - Alfalfa snout beetle
- Phalaenoides glycinae - Grapevine moth
- Phytomyza gymnostoma - Allium leaf miner
- Popilla japonica - Japanese beetle
- Rhagoletis cerasi - European cherry fruit fly
- Rhagoletis mendax - Blueberry maggot
- Rhagoletis pomonella - Apple maggot
- Sesamia cretica - Durra stem borer
- Sirex noctilio - Sirex woodwasp
- Spilonota albicana - Large apple fruit moth
- Tetropium fuscum - Brown spruce longhorn beetle
- Trogoderma granarium - Khapra beetle
- Tuta absoluta - Tomato leaf-miner, South American tomato moth
- Viteus vitifoliae - Grape phylloxera

==== Arachnids ====
- Amphitetranychus viennensis - hawthorn spider mite

==== Mollusks ====
- Achatina achatina - Giant West African snail
- Achatina fulica - Giant African snail
- Archachatina degneri - Giant African land snail
- Archachatina purpurea - Giant African land snail
- Archachatina ventricosa - Giant African land snail
- Arion ater - Black Slug
- Cornu aspersum - European brown garden snail
- Theba pisana - White garden snail

==== Pathogens ====
- Apple Proliferation Phytoplasma
- Ophiognomonia clavigignenti-juglandacearum - Butternut Canker
- Beech Bark Disease
- Beech Leaf Disease
- Chestnut Blight
- Ophiostoma ulmi (Bruisman) and Ophiostoma novo-ulmi (Brasier) - Dutch Elm Disease
- Bretziella fagacearum fungus - Oak Wilt
- Thousand Canker Disease
- Cronartium ribicola - White Pine Blister Rust

=== Vertebrates ===
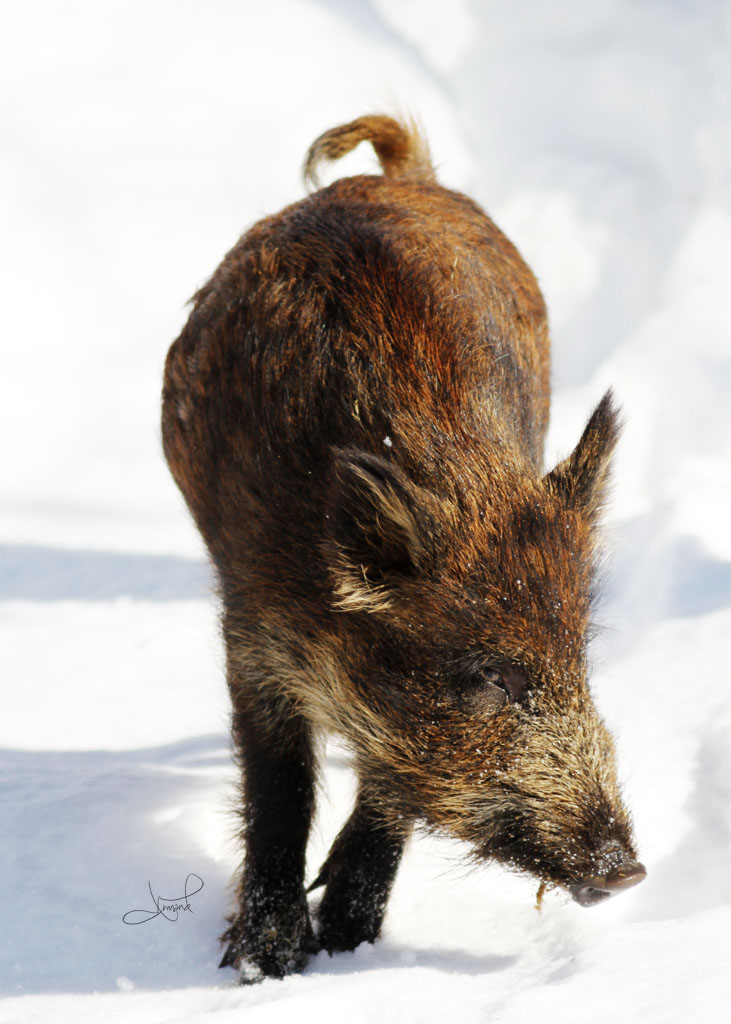
In Alberta, Feral pigs (Sus scrofa) act as highly destructive invasive pests that damage native ecosystems and riparian zones through extensive digging, rooting, and wallowing behavior.

- Lithobates catesbeianus - American Bullfrog
- Podarcis muralis - European Wall Lizard
- Sciurus carolinensis - Eastern Grey Squirrel
- Sus scrofa - Feral Pig

== Aquatic species ==
Aquatic species are those that have evolved to sustain life in water. Aquatic invasive species in Canada are found on shorelines and in numerous waterways.

== See also ==
- Wildlife of Canada
- Canada Wildlife Act
- List of Wildlife Species at Risk (Canada)
- List of invasive species in North America
- Invasive species in the United States
