= Aquatic invasive species in Canada =

Canadian aquatic invasive species are all forms of life that traditionally has not been native to Canada's waterways. In Eastern Canada, non-native plant and animal species are a concern to biologists. Bringing non-native species such as invasive fishes into Canada can damage the environment and ecosystem by repressing native species due to food competition or preying. Invasive fishes enter the fresh waters of Canada in several ways including drifting, deliberate introduction, accidental release, experimental purposes and, most commonly, through the attachment on international boat hulls. Invasive species are the second biggest threat to fish and other marine life in Canada behind loss of habitat and degradation. The threat to native species is primarily caused by impacts on the food web; however, invasive species also bring dangerous pathogens and physically interfere with existing aquatic life. Invasive species include sea lampreys, zebra mussels, smallmouth bass, European green crab, vase tunicate, and sea squirts.

== Fresh water species ==
=== Sea lampreys ===
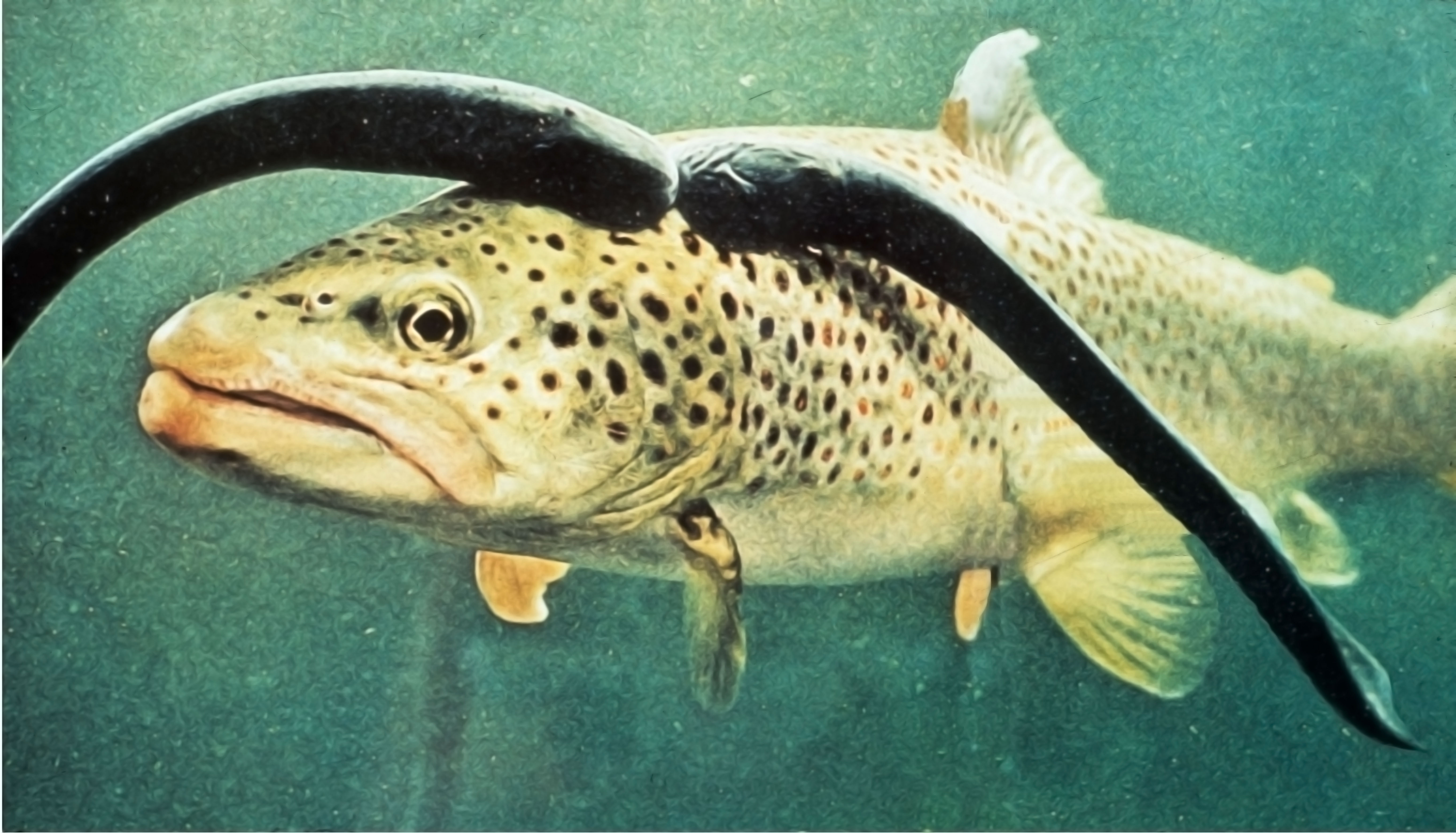
Sea lampreys attached to a brown trout

The sea lamprey began migrating to fresh water like Lake Ontario from the Atlantic Ocean through canals in the 1830s, and have spread to more waters including the Great Lakes. They are identified by their cylindrical black body and sharp teeth. They feed on the blood of other fish by attaching with their sucker and using their teeth and tongue to penetrate. Their attacks are effective (killing ~86% of fish attacked) and widespread to many species.

Sea lampreys devastated the fishing industry of the Great Lakes. Within 20 years of the lamprey entering the Great Lakes, the harvesting of lake trout was reduced by 98%. Control efforts included lampricides, physical barriers, pheromone alarms and baiting, and trapping. The control has been extremely successful in reducing sea lamprey populations.

=== Zebra mussels ===
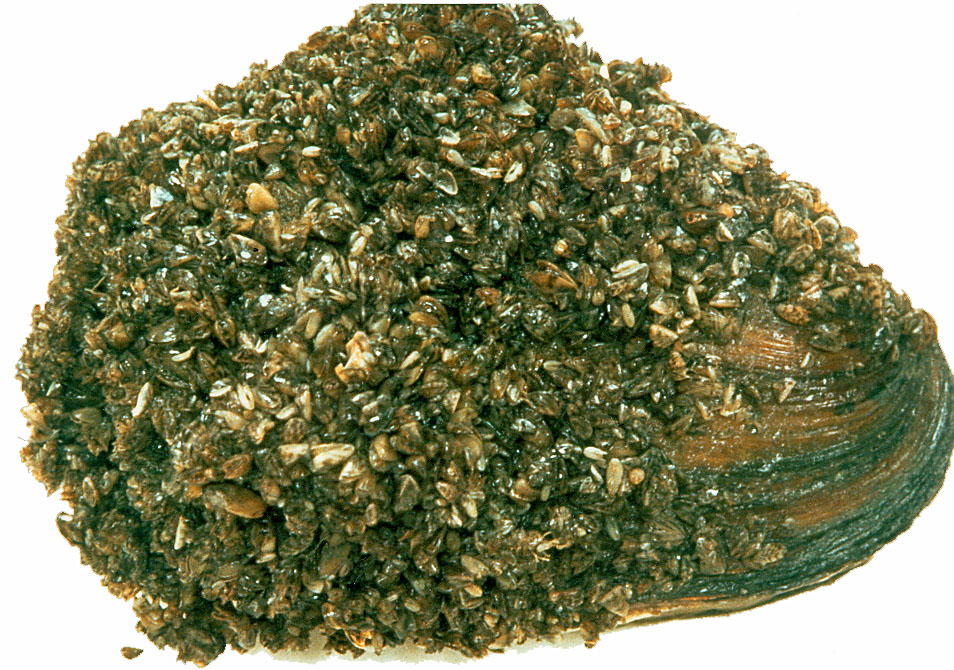
Native Great Lakes mussel coated with zebra mussels

Another example of the migration of non-native species is Dreissena polymorpha, common name Zebra Mussel, originating in Western Asia. They first appeared in North America in 1988 in Lake St Clair and have spread through the Great Lakes and other fresh waters. They can be identified as small triangular mussels with a flat bottom and dark, zigzagged stripes.

The Zebra mussels are filter feeders and breed repidly. Large populations of mussels can grow in Canadian fresh waters, and their massive filtering capacity damages the environment for native species. The filtering changes the growth of algae, vegetation, and bacteria which hurts native fish growth and allows Zebra mussels to outcompete native mussels. Zebra mussels are illegal to import due to their ecological impact and damage they cause to boats and infrastructure.

=== Smallmouth bass ===
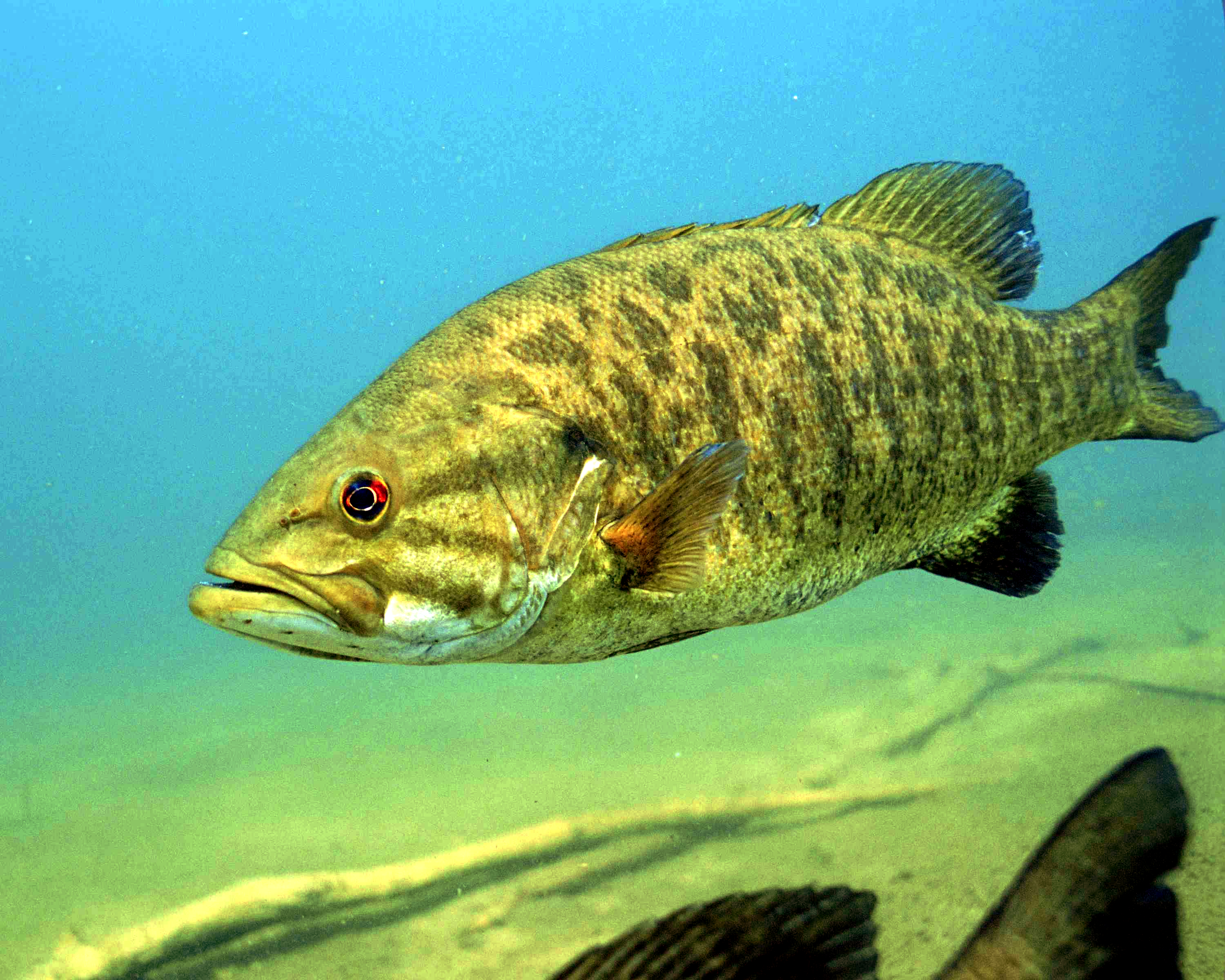
Smallmouth bass

The smallmouth bass is only an invasive species in some parts of Canada, as it is a native species to the Great Lakes and connected waters. The smallmouth bass has mostly been introduced due to fishing, either being used as bait or being purposefully added to new lakes to be fished. They have a thinner body than the largemouth bass, with a mouth that does not go past the eye and stripes near the eye. The overall body shape and color is dependent on its environment, so the smallmouth bass can have different appearances.

The smallmouth bass is considered invasive because it is a dominant predator. They can disrupt the native environment by outcompeting or directly preying on native species, as well as quickly reproducing. They occupy a relatively unique habitat, so they do not compete against other predators and can hunt extensively in their niche. Since the smallmouth bass is both native and invasive within Canada, there is not a national control strategy, instead, different areas handle the smallmouth bass differently.

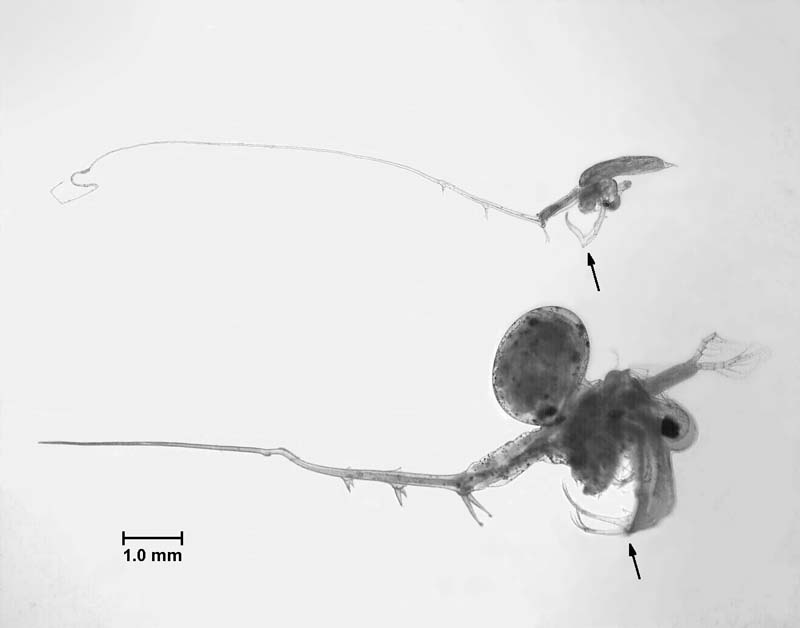
Bythotrephes longimanus, or Spiny Waterflea

=== Spiny waterflea ===
Spiny waterfleas are invasive microorganisms that inhabit both fresh and saltwater habitats; they were first reported as an invasive species in Canada in 1982. They traveled to Lake Ontario from Eurasia via ballast water from ocean liners, which are transportation passenger ships, and typically spread faster in areas with higher human interference. Spiny waterfleas have spread to Lake Ontario, Lake Michigan, Lake Huron, Lake Superior, and Lake Eerie; they can also be found in over 179 Ontario inland bodies of water as well as other non native areas in Europe. These predacious zooplanktivores have reduced zooplankton populations as well as biodiversity in the areas they have invaded. This, in turn, affects organisms in other trophic levels that depend upon these zooplankton and the organisms that eat them, such as walleye; the health of these species are also often impacted by the tail of the spiny waterflea which can sometimes be dangerous.

=== Grass carp ===
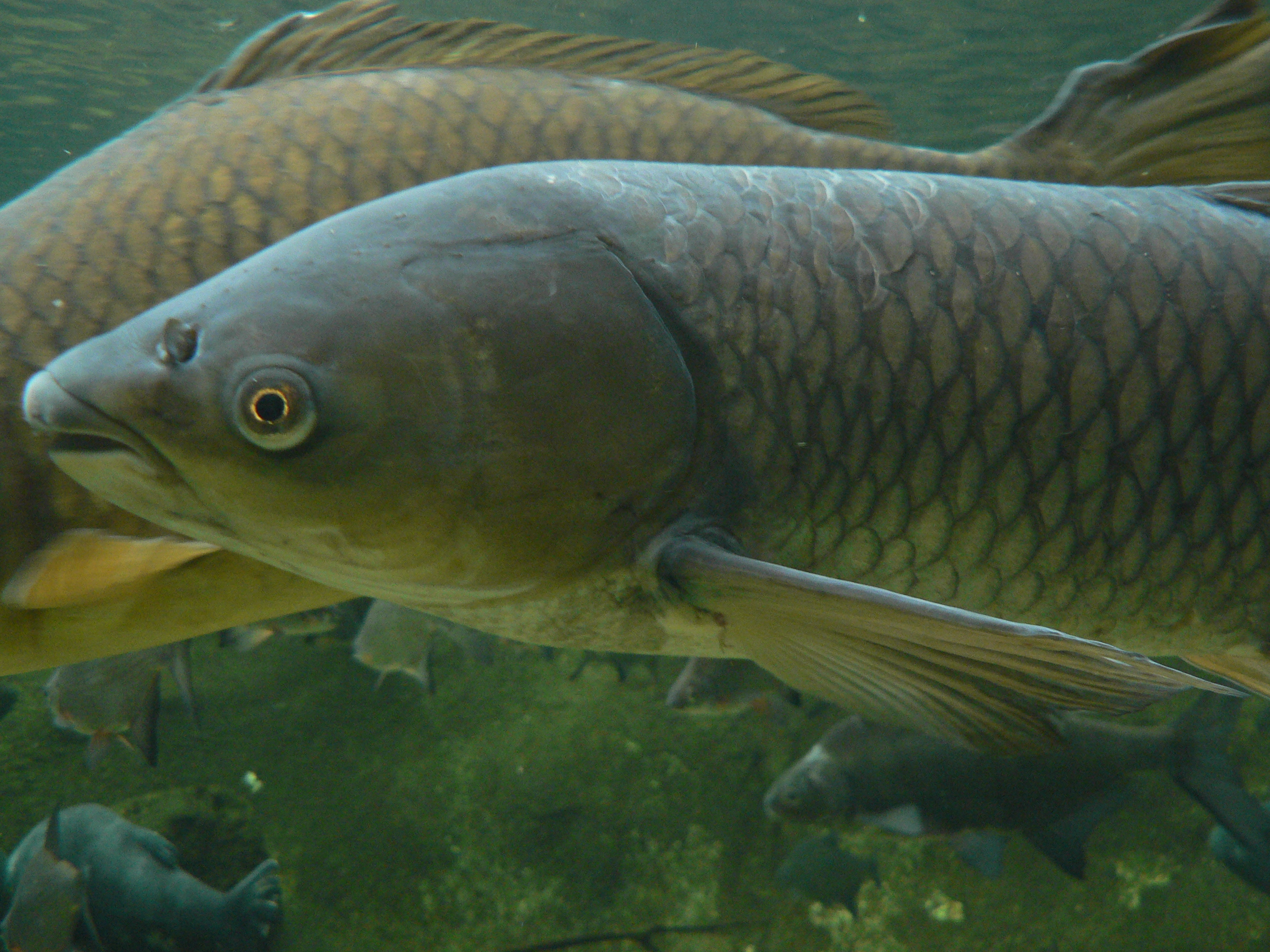
Grass Carp

Grass carp (Ctenopharyngodon idella) were first introduced in the United States in the early 1960s for biological control of aquatic plants. Though this was successful, these carp have spread to Lake Erie as well as other parts of the Great Lakes. Grass Carp consume vegetation necessary for native fish in these areas. Removal of this vegetation also alters nesting areas for waterfowl. Overall, this leads to a decline in biological productivity and energy flow throughout the ecosystem. Economically, this destruction results in shoreline erosion, accumulation of sediment, and problems within water management. Grass Carp are one many types of Carp, such as the Silver Carp and the Bighead Carp. Grass Carp can be identified by their wide, scaleless heads, very short snouts, and lack of barbels. They are dark grey in color with a slight golden shine on their sides and white towards the belly.

== Salt water species ==
=== European green crab ===
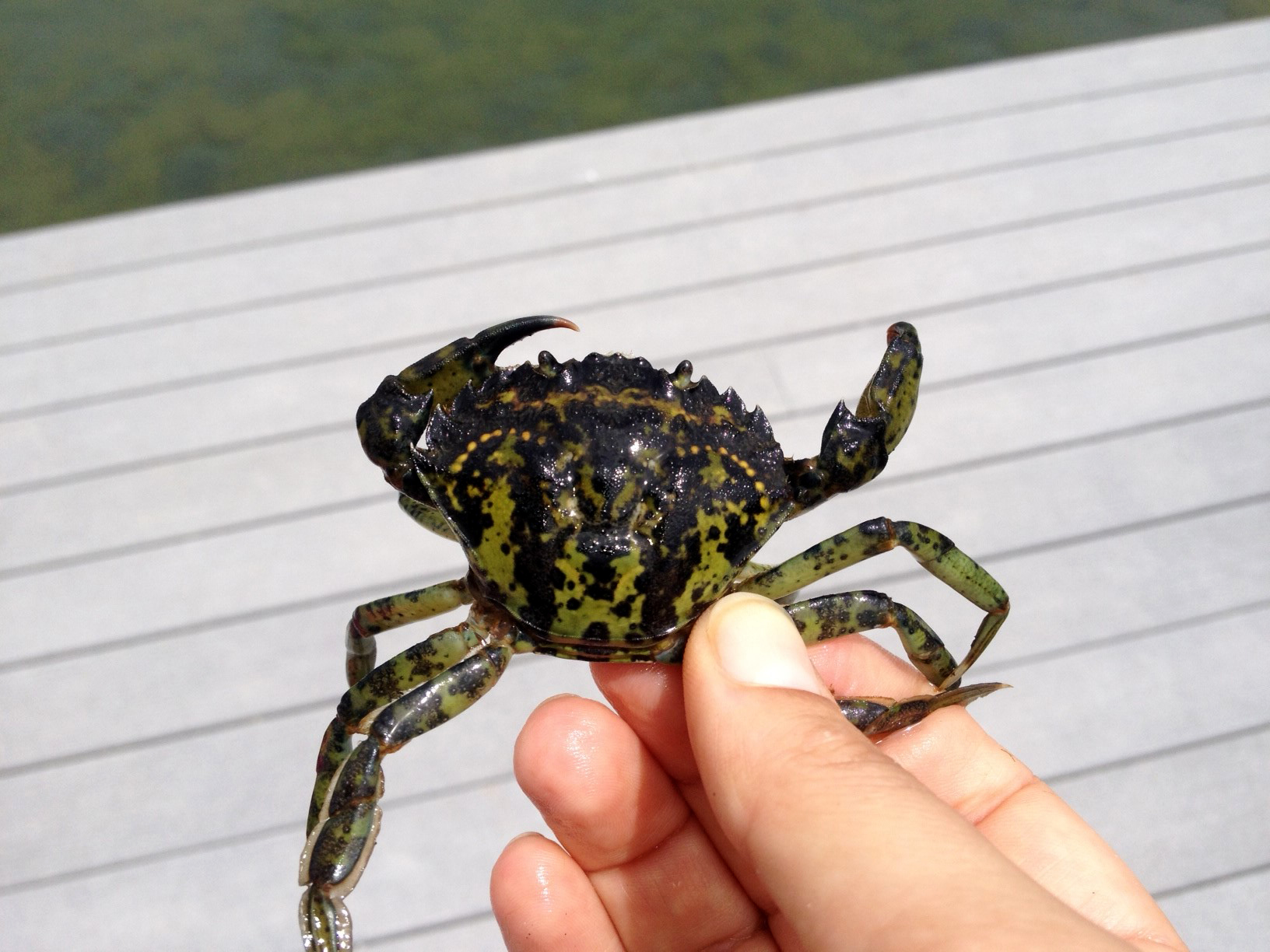
European green crab

The European green crab (Carcinus maenas) is an invasive species on the Atlantic coast of Canada, and has since also invaded the Pacific coast in British Columbia. The European Green Crab travels on both recreational and trading boats, and their larvae can travel great distances to establish new populations. This species can be green, red, or yellow with 2 claws, a saw-like shell, and pointed, hairy back legs. It is smaller than other species, but it is similar in appearance to the native Rock, Jonah, and Lady crabs.

The European green crab is dangerous as an invasive species for the aggressive nature in which it inhabits new waters. They prey on shellfish species with their claws that can easily open the shells. This causes problems for the fishing of species such as clams, crustaceans, and other shellfish. They also affect vegetation by cutting down eel-grass that native fish and birds rely on.

=== Vase tunicate ===
Vase tunicates have a widespread distribution on coasts in the Atlantic and Pacific Ocean, making their native distribution difficult to determine; however, it is thought to be native to the North Atlantic. Even with this uncertainty, the vase tunicate is considered invasive to Canada, where it has been identified for over a hundred and fifty years. Recently, the vase tunicate has been documented invading into Newfoundland waters. It is identified as a clear, tube-shaped organism that attaches to hard surfaces in the water.

The vase tunicate can invade due to its ability to reproduce continually, and it can attach to many surfaces including boats and other man-made aquatic infrastructure. They are dangerous invaders because they are filter-feeders, so they compete with other filter-feeding species like mussels, and their filtering changes the surrounding environment. They have caused particular issues for aqua farming in Nova Scotia and Prince Edward Island, where businesses have to invest in removing vase tunicates, and their yields have been reduced. Increased monitoring of boats and waters to identify vase tunicates is used as a control mechanism to avoid further impacts on the mussel industry in The Maritimes.

=== Sea squirts ===
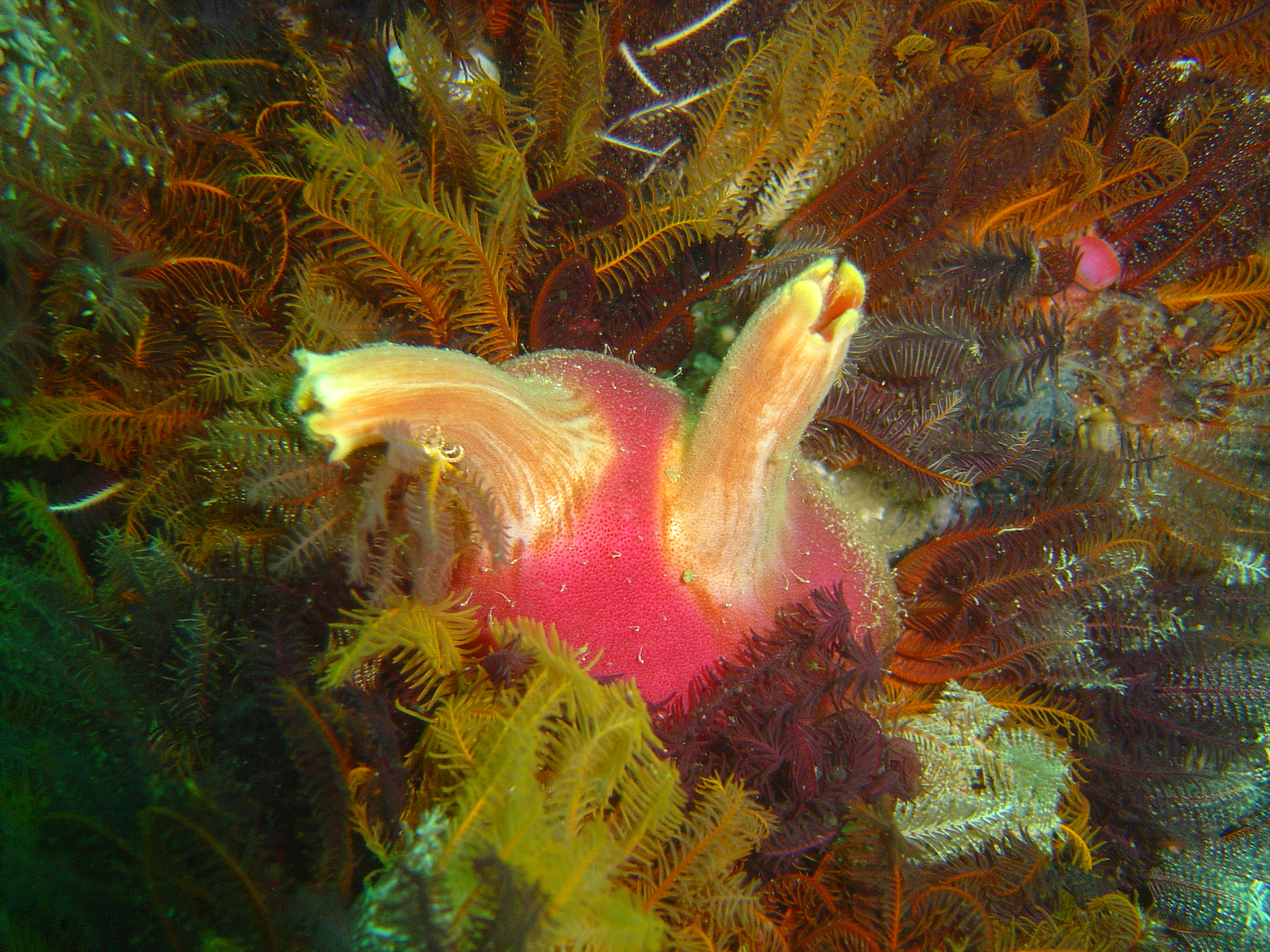
Sea squirts in a reef

Several species of non-native ascidians with known negative impacts to aquaculture operations have been introduced and established to both the Pacific and Atlantic coasts of Canada. These non-native sea squirt species include: Ascidiella aspersa (the European sea squirt), Botrylloides violaceus (the violet tunicate), Botryllus schlosseri (the golden star tunicate), Didemnum vexillum (the pancake batter tunicate), Diplosoma listerianum, and Styela clava (the stalked tunicate). Ciona intestinalis is generally considered a cryptogenic species that is invading eastern Canada, including Newfoundland.

=== Golden star tunicate ===
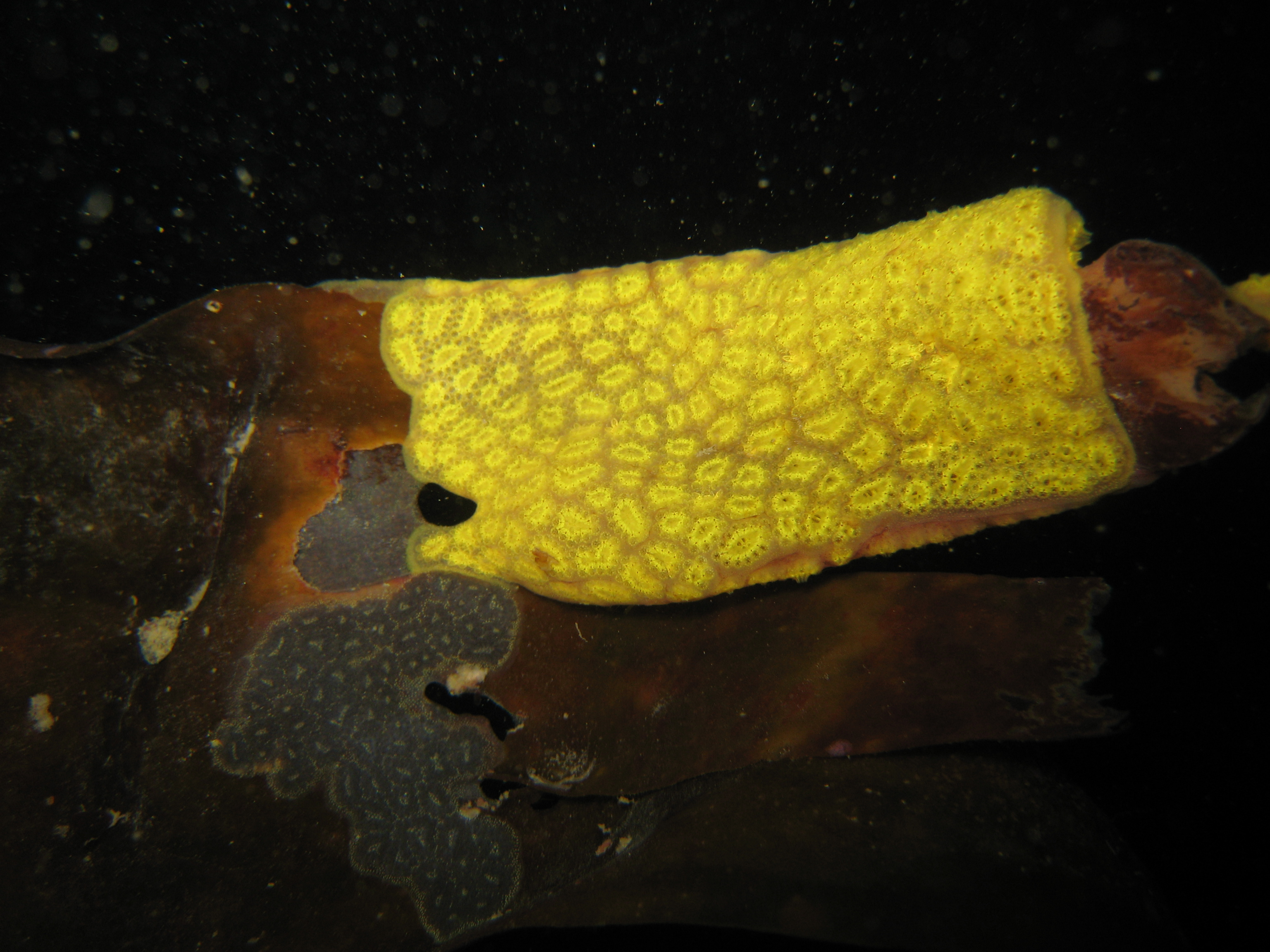
B. schlosseri

Golden star tunicates are observed in much of the world though they are invasive to eastern Canada and the Gulf of Saint Lawrence. They can be identified by their flower or star shaped zooids, their clear coat, and their gelatinous texture. They negatively affect shellfish, bottom-dwelling fish, and aquaculture farmers. This is because they directly compete for the same resources, whether they be food or space. Golden star tunicate can reproduce by free swimming larvae, or by the creation of a fragment which can grow into a full colony. Boats, docks, and other sea structures allow the golden star tunicate to spread more effectively.

== See also ==
- Wildlife of Canada
- Invasive species in Canada
- List of Wildlife Species at Risk (Canada)
- List of invasive species in North America
- Invasive species in the United States
