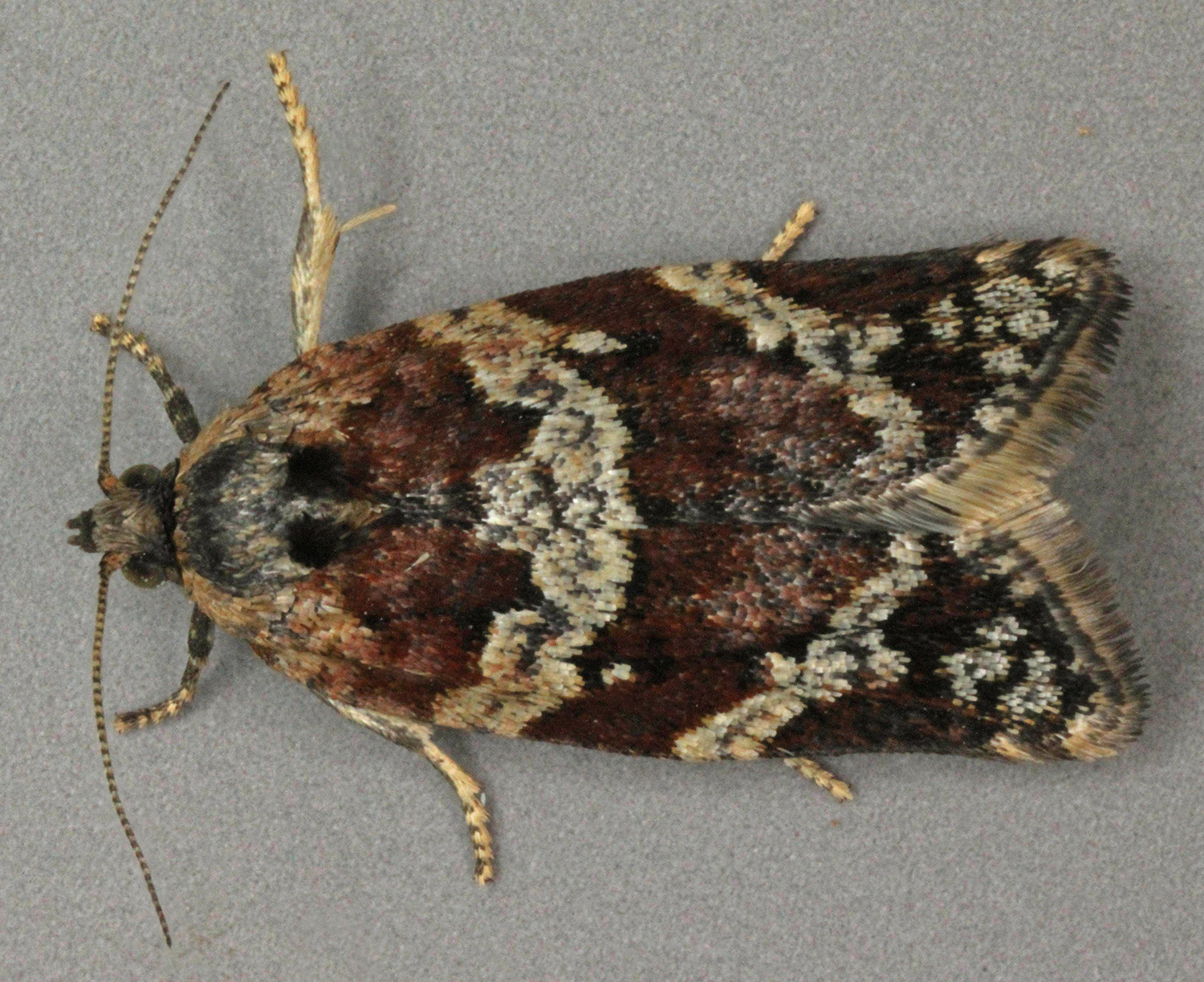
- Argyrotaenia ljungiana Bettisfield Moss, North Wales

Scientific classification
- Domain: Eukaryota
- Kingdom: Animalia
- Phylum: Arthropoda
- Class: Insecta
- Order: Lepidoptera
- Family: Tortricidae
- Genus: Argyrotaenia
- Species: A. ljungiana

Binomial name
- Argyrotaenia ljungiana (Thunberg, 1797)

Synonyms
- Tortrix ljungiana Thunberg, 1797; Argyrotaenia cognatana Stephens, 1852; Argyrotaenia fuscociliana Stephens, 1852; lepidana Herrich-Schaffer, 1855; Olethreutes micantana Lucas, 1937; Olethreutes micanthana Razowski, 1961; Tortrix politana Haworth, [1811]; Tortrix pulchellana Haworth, [1811]; Tortrix sylvana Hubner, [1796-1799]

= Argyrotaenia ljungiana =

Species of moth from Europe

Argyrotaenia ljungiana is a moth of the family Tortricidae. It is found in Europe.

The wingspan is 12–16 mm. Thorax has two hair-tufts. The species is quite variable in colour. The silver-white ground colour may be suffused with grey; and the usually red-brown markings may be close to black. The forewing tends to have three lighter cross-bands, the innermost of which sometimes has a square brown spot at the inner edge. The hindwings are grey-brown and the inner part of the wing fringe is bright so that there is a narrow, light strip along the outer edge. Julius von Kennel provides a full description.

The moth flies in two generations from April to August.

The larvae feed on Ericaceae, Myrica gale and Vaccinium but have also been spotted feeding on grapes and apples.
