= Fisheries Act (Canada) =

Canadian federal legislation regulating commercial fishing

Parliament of Canada
- Long title: An Act respecting fisheries
- Citation: R.S.C., 1985, c. F-14
- Enacted by: Parliament of Canada
- Status: In force

The Fisheries Act (French: Loi sur les pêches) is legislation enacted by the Parliament of Canada, governing the powers of government to regulate fisheries and fishing vessels. The act has been undergoing major regulatory revisions in recent years, including those attached to treaty rights of Miꞌkmaq in Atlantic Canada. The Minister designated under the Act is the Ministers of Fisheries, Oceans and the Canadian Coast Guard.

== Legislative history ==
=== Pre-confederation ===
Similar statutes existed even before Confederation in some pre-Confederation jurisdictions. Since confederation, the British North America Act established all coastal and inland fisheries as being under the jurisdiction of the federal level of government. The Province of Canada had the An Act to amend Chapter 62 of the Consolidated Statutes of Canada, and to provide for the better regulation of Fishing and protection of Fisheries.

=== Initial Act ===
The Act, then known as An Act for the regulation of Fishing and the protection of Fisheries was passed into law on May 22, 1868, in the 1st Canadian Parliament. The Act replaced An Act to amend Chapter 62 of the Consolidated Statutes of Canada, and to provide for the better regulation of Fishing and protection of Fisheries passed by the Province of Canada. It was passed at the same time with An Act respecting fishing by foreign vessels.

The initial Act defined Fishery Officers, who each had Justice of the Peace powers, and defined forbidden practices in the cod, whale, seal, salmon, lake and river trout, whitefish and bass and pickerel fisheries. This included closed seasons when fish could not be taken and prohibitions in various areas critical to fish reproduction. It also prohibited the dumping into various fish habitats of "prejudicial or deleterious substances" with a fine of not more than CA$100.

The initial Act included controls on freshwater fishing. These were diminished in the late 1800s by Britain's Judicial Committee of the Privy Council, which ruled that these were more the responsibility of provincial governments. Licensing of fishing was taken over by the provinces, except for sea fisheries, which remained a federal responsibility. However, the Government of Canada did not impose licensing on sea fishing, except on the BC salmon fishery.

Early copies of revised statutes had separate statutes governing fisheries, pilotage, the department of fisheries, lighthouses, and other marine affairs. The 1905 copy of the Revised Statutes of Canada has a copy of the Fisheries Act, the minister was empowered to appoint fisheries officers to oversee fisheries, enabled the Minister to create a licensing system for fishermen, broadly prohibited whaling with the exception of instances approved by the minister, statutorily banned seine nets for use in cod or mackerel fishing, established prohibitions on salmon and trout fishing by means of a closed season and banned use of swing nets in salmon fishing, protected salmon spawning zones, regulated lobster licenses, gave officials the authority to impound illegally caught fish, banning dams in fishing rivers except as approved by government or for eel weirs, banning using fish as fertilizer, banning certain types of materials from being disposed into waterways, creating a broad regulatory authority for the minister, and creating offences and penalties. The Act notably did separate out First Nations as being capable of being given special dispensation for spearfishing by the minister, a likely acknowledgment of treaty rights.

=== Updates ===
The contemporary fisheries act has many of the same objectives, including preventing pollution, regulating harvesting seasons, licensing fishers, establishing the Indigenous framework for fishing, creating penalties, empowering officers, and giving the Minister authority to regulate.

The regulations under the act are broad, and include regulations on ballast dumping, the experimental lakes area, marine mammals, wastewater effluent and aquaculture, in addition to more traditional things like regulating provincial fisheries, fish roe, registration of foreign fishing vessels and protecting certain fishing habitats. In general, regulations now take up much of the detail that was formerly enshrined in legislation.

In the 1970s, the Act added environmental protection. The Act specifically prohibited the "harmful alteration, disruption or destruction of fish habitat".

The Harper government reduced protections in the Fisheries Act during its term. Its 2012 amendments reduced protections to only apply to "a commercial, recreational or aboriginal fishery." Previously, the Act prohibited the killing of fish by other than fishing and prohibited any undertakings that caused harmful disruption or destruction of fish habitat. One election issue in the 2015 federal election was the resurrection of environmental protections eliminated during the Harper government.

Major changes were approved in 2019, focusing on improved permitting authority for the government, giving authority to regulate inland fisheries entirely through regulation and referencing biodiversity.

== Controversies ==
=== 2012 and 2019 reforms ===
The reforms to the Fisheries Act by the Harper government were controversial, including placing a reduced importance on habitat conservation and ecology, and making it easier to construct pipelines. The government acknowledged potential environmental costs but highlighted its important role in balancing those costs with economic benefits. In general, the act's revisions shifted focus away from punishing companies for degradation of fish habitat to punishment only in the cases of serious harms to fish themselves, a standard less likely to happen and more difficult to prove

The Liberals, under Justin Trudeau, unseated the Harper government, and in 2018, the Trudeau government revised the Act to provide for clearer permit requirements, the incorporation of policies into regulations, provisions to protect biodiversity, Indigenous participation on habitat decisions, and the requirement to rebuild fish habitats. The Act became law in 2019.

The 2019 law saw significant debate in parliament, including proposed Senate amendments to the Commons bill. The bill was to re-establish some environmental regulation that was limited in a 2012 amendment led by the Conservative Party of Canada. Much of Conservative criticism of the Liberal, government sponsored bill was that the need for increases in regulatory complexity was not substantial, with one of the most notable critics being Todd Doherty. The New Democrats and Greens both supported the bill in debate at the Second Reading stage, with the NDP being particularly motivated by changes respecting Pacific Salmon and Indigenous Knowledge.

In a sitting, most Senate amendments were agreed to by the Commons, and addressed, shark finning, definitions of habitat, and language regarding Indigenous Rights. There was not a recorded vote on Third Reading, as the Act had widespread support of the Commons.

Submissions to the Commons on the topic garnered 57 briefs, and the Commons Committee on Fisheries and Oceans invited 48 witnesses to testify. Stakeholders that presented included First Nations Groups, provincial hydroelectric generation authorities, private citizens, municipal associations, conservation groups, fishers, and fishing industry groups.

=== Cod moratorium ===
After overfishing of cod led to a major decline in cod fish populations, the federal government imposed the Atlantic cod moratorium via the Act. The moratorium was met with protests. The disappearance of the cod fishery has led to widespread stagnation and population decline in Newfoundland and Labrador. It was hoped that cod fish populations would recover after the imposition of the moratorium, but this has not been the case.

=== Mi'kmaw lobster dispute ===
In the wake of the Marshall decision, the Department of Fisheries and Oceans was obligated by the courts to promulgate regulations on how Mi'kmaw communities could fish to provide for themselves a "moderate livelihood". The government was slow to implement this 1999 decision, and by 2021, tensions over this had risen. When Mi'kmaw fishermen began setting down traps before the government had established regulations as a form of protest against the inertia and slow pace, conflict arose when government officials confiscated traps. This further led to conflicts between the Mi'kmaw communities and Canadian settlers, who were angered over the Mi'kmaw rights and were concerned about the health of fisheries as Mi'kmaw were able to harvest at a commercial level outside of the normal fishing season. There was property damage against property owned by Mi'kmaw.

=== Pacific Herring dispute ===
There have been disputes as to the proper amount of allowable catch in Pacific Herring industries to be able to sustain the fish stock.

=== Department of Fisheries Conflict of Interest ===
Concerns have been raised and it remains an active debate as to whether there is a conflict of interest to have the minister responsible for the well-being of the fisheries industry to be the same minister responsible for preservation of coastal environment and fish habitat. The government contends that healthy ecosystems are also good for fishing prospects, and so the interests are aligned, not in conflict. Opponents contend there is already evidence of conflict causing changes in policy, that the expert opinion in the Cohen Commission highlighted the issue before, and that the government seemed to grant many exemptions to the normal critical level that would normally trigger dramatic restrictions on fishing.

== List of regulations ==
- Aboriginal Communal Fishing Licences Regulations
- Alberta Fishery Regulations, 1998
- Aquaculture Activities Regulations
- Aquatic Invasive Species Regulations
- Atlantic Fishery Regulations, 1985
- Authorizations Concerning Fish and Fish Habitat Protection Regulations
- Ballast Water Regulations
- British Columbia Sport Fishing Regulations, 1996
- Conditions for Making Regulations Under Subsection 36(5.2) of the Fisheries Act, Regulations Establishing
- Deposit Out of the Normal Course of Events Notification Regulations
- Dogfish Exemption Notice
- Experimental Lakes Area Research Activities Regulations
- Fish Toxicant Regulations
- Fishery (General) Regulations
- Foreign Vessel Fishing Regulations
- Management of Contaminated Fisheries Regulations
- Manitoba Fishery Regulations, 1987
- Marine Mammal Regulations
- Maritime Provinces Fishery Regulations
- Meat and Poultry Products Plant Liquid Effluent Regulations
- Metal and Diamond Mining Effluent Regulations
- Newfoundland and Labrador Fishery Regulations
- Northwest Territories Fishery Regulations
- Ontario Fishery Regulations, 1989
- Ontario Fishery Regulations, 2007
- Order Declaring that the Wastewater Systems Effluent Regulations Do Not Apply in Quebec
- Order Designating the Minister of the Environment as the Minister Responsible for the Administration and Enforcement of Subsections 36(3) to (6) of the Fisheries Act
- Pacific Aquaculture Regulations
- Pacific Fishery Management Area Regulations, 2007
- Pacific Fishery Regulations, 1993
- Pacific Hake Exemption Notice
- Petroleum Refinery Liquid Effluent Regulations
- Potato Processing Plant Liquid Effluent Regulations
- Pulp and Paper Effluent Regulations
- Quebec Fishery Regulations, 1990
- Roe Herring Exemption Notice
- Saskatchewan Fishery Regulations, 1995
- Wastewater Systems Effluent Regulations
- Wastewater Systems Effluent Regulations Do Not Apply in Yukon, Order Declaring that the
- Yukon Territory Fishery Regulations

== Related legislation ==
The following Acts refer to or support the Fisheries Act.

- Canada Shipping Act
- Canada Shipping Act, 2001
- Coastal Fisheries Protection Act
- Department of Fisheries and Oceans Act
- Financial Administration Act
- Fish Inspection Act
- Fisheries Development Act
- Fisheries Prices Support Act (repealed)
- Fishing and Recreational Harbours Act
- Freshwater Fish Marketing Act
- Navigable Waters Protection Act
- Oceans Act
- Species at Risk Act

== See also ==
- Minister of Fisheries, Oceans and the Canadian Coast Guard
- Shipping Act
