= Rocky Mountains subalpine zone =

Biotic zone in North America

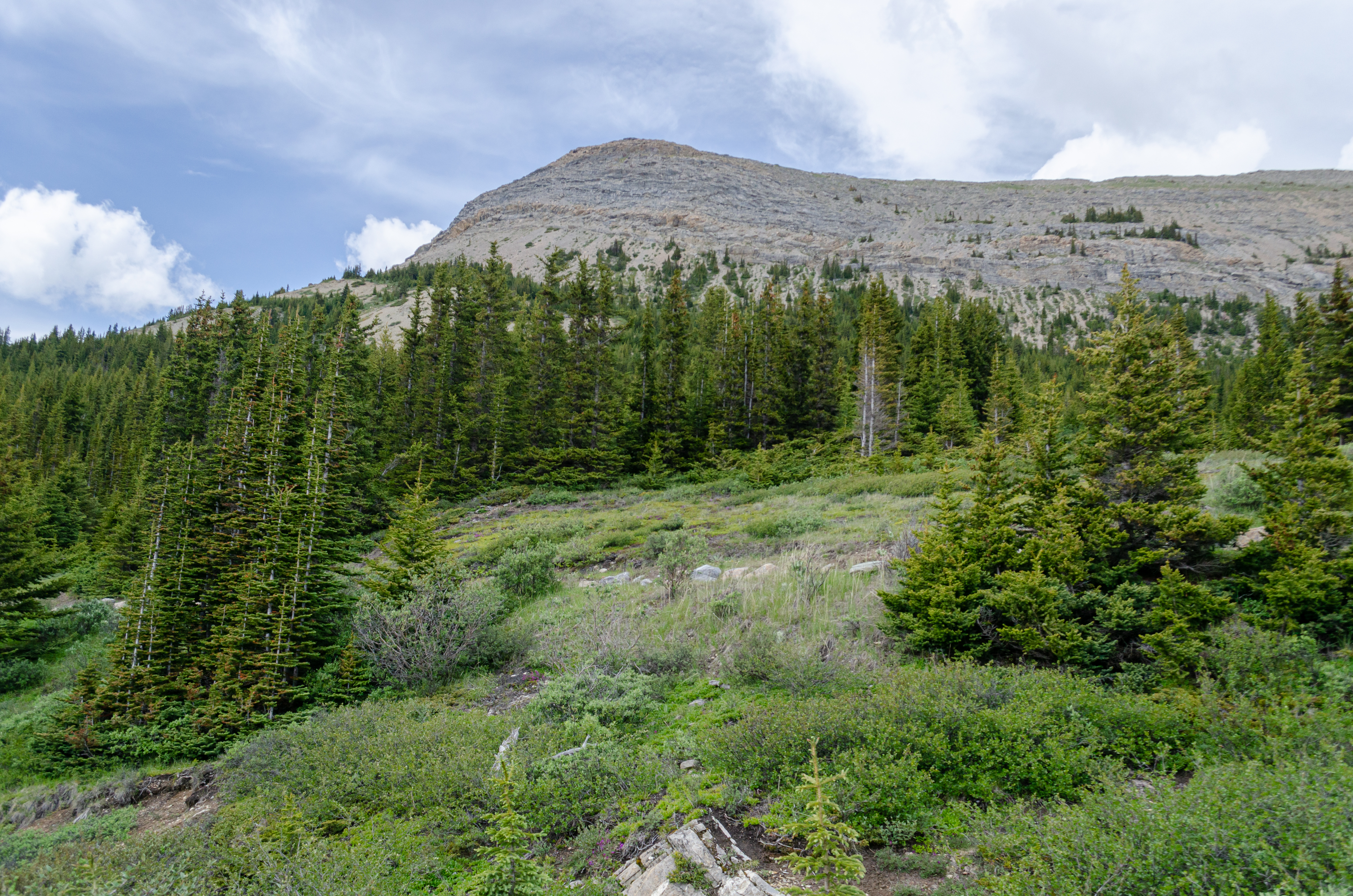
Spruce-fir forest in the Canadian Rockies

The Rocky Mountains subalpine zone is the biotic zone immediately below tree line in the Rocky Mountains of North America. In northern New Mexico, the subalpine zone occupies elevations approximately from 9,000 to 12,000 feet (2,700 to 3,700 m); while in northern Alberta, the subalpine zone extends from 1,350 to 2,300 metres (4,400 to 7,500 ft).

== Climate ==
The climate of the Rocky Mountains subalpine zone is never warm, with summer highs reaching 75 °F (24 °C) on only the warmest days near the montane zone, and commonly failing to reach 60 °F (16 °C) near tree line; Frost may occur any day of the year. Although winter low temperatures may be warmer than those in nearby lower valleys, typically staying above −10 °F (−23 °C), prodigious snows blanket the region well into spring. Some drifts may linger into summer. Convectional precipitation, typically thunderstorms, often forms rapidly and frequently includes graupel or hail. Although uncommon, hurricane-force winds may develop and cause massive destruction such as the Routt Divide Blowdown.

== Flora and fauna ==
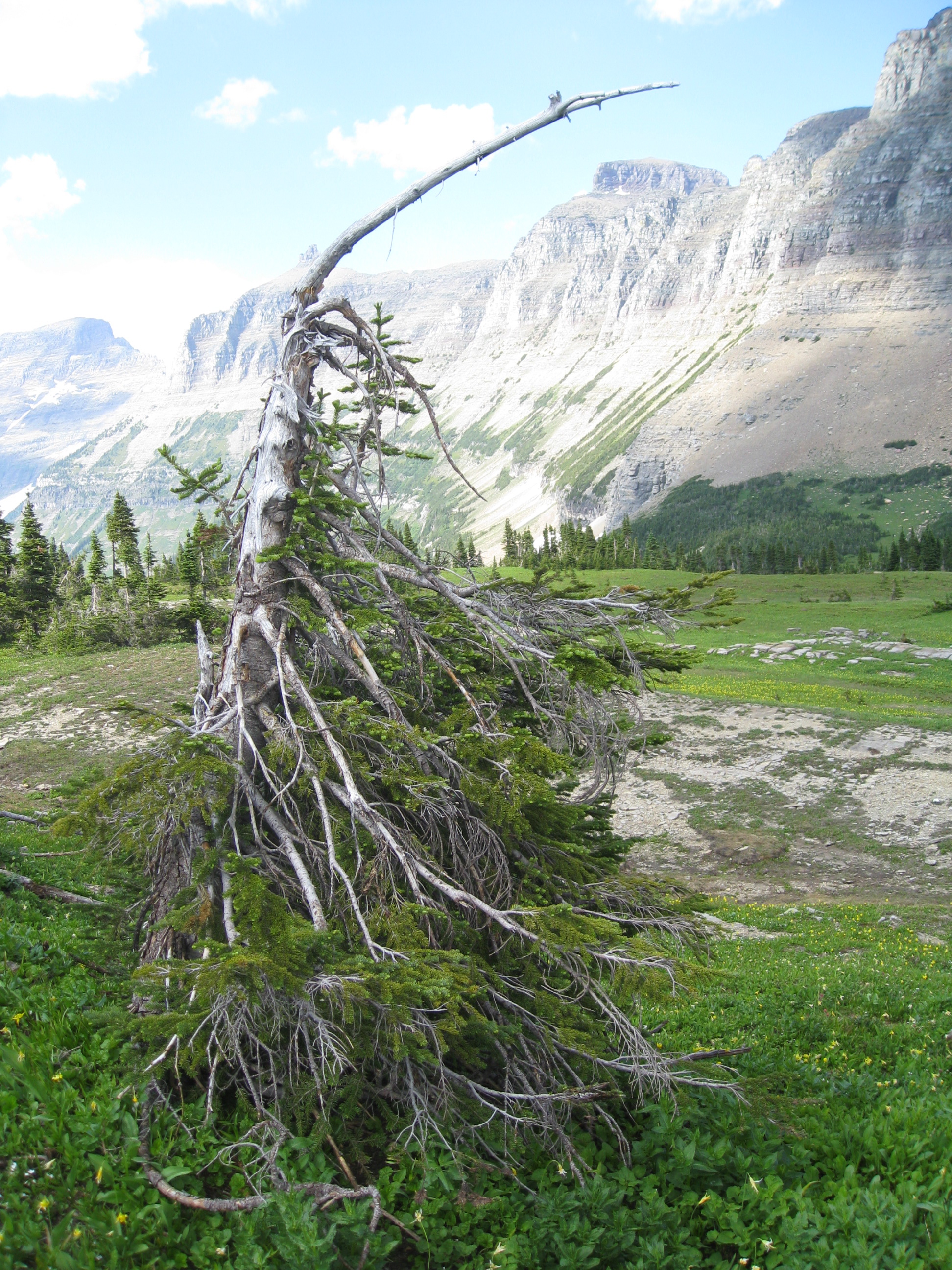
A subalpine fir near treeline in Glacier National Park, twisted into an unusual shape

In the North American Rocky Mountains, the region is characterized by a concentration of subalpine fir and Engelmann spruce and generally the exclusion of trees found more commonly at lower elevations such as aspen, ponderosa pine and lodgepole pine. In other areas, Engelmann spruce and subalpine fir mix with or give way to various pines, such as limber pine, whitebark pine and bristlecone pine, other firs such as Douglas-fir and silver fir, and various junipers and other hardy species. Previously burned areas may contain varying amounts, or even almost pure stands, of lodgepole pine. Ground cover in a previously burned forest area often includes two species of huckleberry.

On exposed, dry slopes at high elevations, subalpine white pine forests replace spruce-fir forests. Common species of the white pine forests include whitebark pine in the northern Rocky Mountains, limber pine in the central and north-central Rocky Mountains, and bristlecone pine in the southern Rocky Mountains. Typical intervals between fires range from 50 to 300 years. White pines are tolerant of extreme environmental conditions and can be important postfire successional species. In high, windblown areas, trees often grow into grotesque shapes.

The whitebark pine is a keystone species in upper subalpine forests of the northern Rocky Mountains. However, the whitebark pine has been in decline due to White Pine Blister Rust: whitebark pine mortality in some areas exceeds 90%. Entire forest vistas, like that at Avalanche Ridge near Yellowstone National Park's east gate, are expanses of dead, gray whitebarks.

Due to harsh winters and a relative dearth of food sources, the subalpine harbors limited native animal species. While bears and the cougar visit the subalpine, lynx, the snowshoe hare, the American marten and various squirrels are among the few important native mammals. A few birds, such as the mountain chickadee and Steller's jay are commonly seen and heard in Rocky Mountain subalpine regions, with others such as owls, nuthatches and certain finches less obvious.

== See also ==
- Ecoregion
- Life zone
- Ecology of the Rocky Mountains
- Sierra Nevada subalpine zone
