= List of Migratory Bird Sanctuaries of Canada =

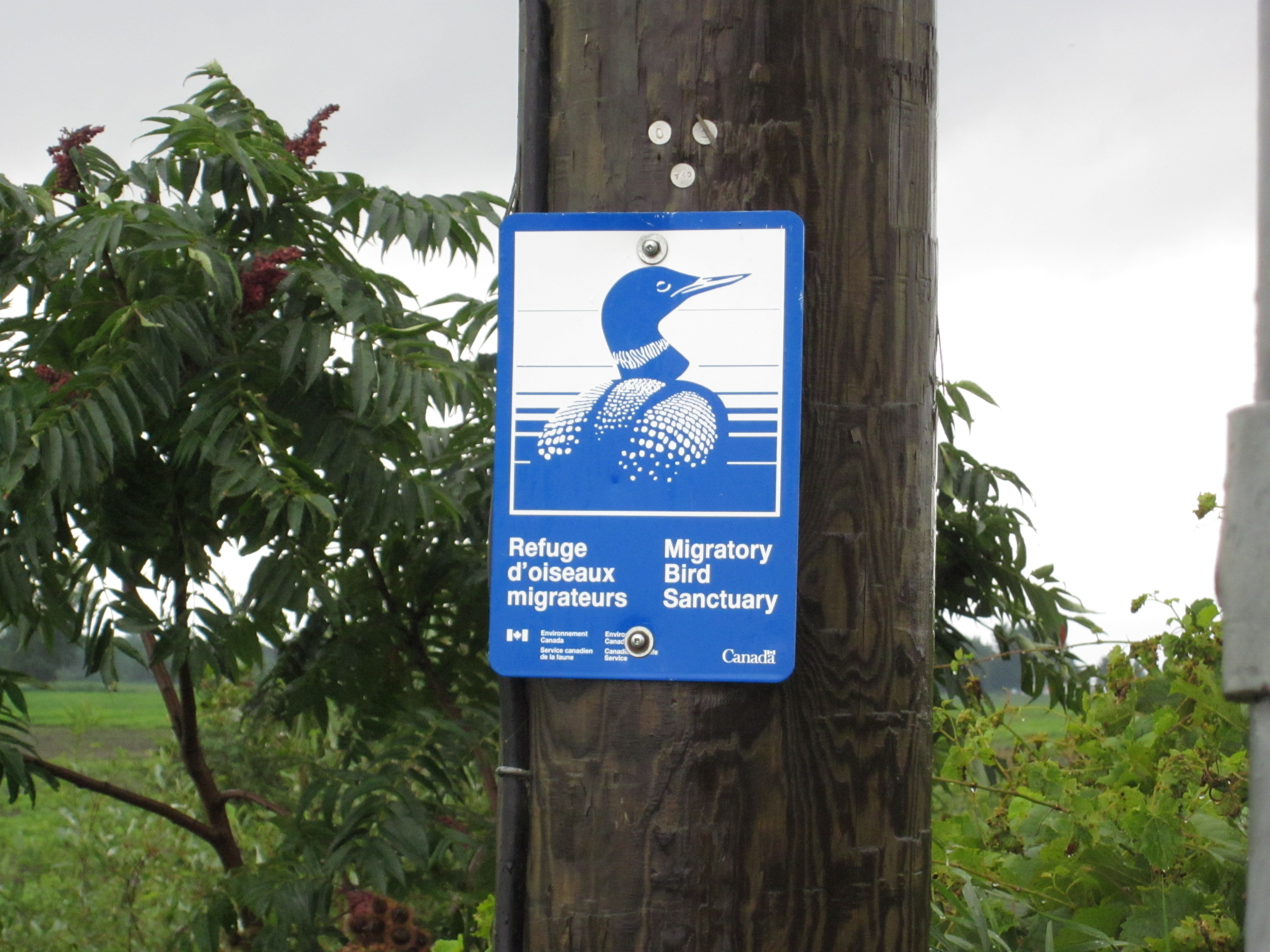
Sign on the limit of Nicolet Migratory Bird Sanctuary, Quebec.

Migratory Bird Sanctuaries are created in Canada under the Migratory Birds Convention Act. They are administered by the Canadian Wildlife Service of Environment and Climate Change Canada. As of July 2025 there are ninety-two Migratory Bird Sanctuaries in Canada and the first sanctuary in North America, Last Mountain Lake Bird Sanctuary, was created by federal order-in-council in 1887.

== Provinces ==
=== Alberta ===
As of July 2025 there are four Migratory Bird Sanctuaries in Alberta.

Name	Year established	Area	
Name	Year established	ha	acre
Inglewood	1929	111	270
Red Deer	1924	129	320
Richardson Lake	1949	10,798	26,680
Saskatoon Lake	1948	1,150	2,800

=== British Columbia ===
As of July 2025 there are seven Migratory Bird Sanctuaries in British Columbia.

Name	Year established	Area	
Name	Year established	ha	acre
Christie Islet	1962	1	2.5
Esquimalt Lagoon	1939	134	330
George C. Reifel	1967	376	930
Nechako River	1944	183	450
Shoal Harbour	1931	146	360
Vaseux Lake	1923	559	1,380
Victoria Harbour	1923	1,891	4,670

=== Manitoba ===
Currently there are no Migratory Bird Sanctuaries in the province of Manitoba.

=== New Brunswick ===
As of July 2025 there are three Migratory Bird Sanctuaries in New Brunswick.

Name	Year established	Area	
Name	Year established	ha	acre
Grand Manan	1931	433	1,070
Inkerman	1998	16	40
Machias Seal Island	1944	1,046	2,580

=== Newfoundland and Labrador ===
As of July 2025 there are three Migratory Bird Sanctuaries in Newfoundland and Labrador.

Name	Year established	Area	
Name	Year established	ha	acre
Ile aux Canes	1991	162	400
Shepherd Island	1991	18	44
Terra Nova	1967	1,178	2,910

=== Nova Scotia ===
As of July 2025 there are eight Migratory Bird Sanctuaries in Nova Scotia.

Name	Year established	Area	
Name	Year established	ha	acre
Amherst Point	1947	433	1,070
Big Glace Bay Lake	1939	393	970
Haley Lake	1980	95	230
Kentville	1939	506	1,250
Port Joli	1941	397	980
Port Hebert	1941	346	850
Sable Island	1977	3,100	7,700
Sable River	1941	313	770

=== Ontario ===
As of July 2025 there are nine Migratory Bird Sanctuaries in Ontario.

Name	Year established	Area	
Name	Year established	ha	acre
Beckett Creek	1969	184	450
Chantry Island	1957	19	47
Eleanor Island	1971	1	2.5
Hannah Bay	1939	25,231	62,350
Mississippi Lake	1959	300	740
Moose River	1958	2,690	6,600
Rideau River	1957	752	1,860
St. Joseph's Island	1951	986	2,440
Upper Canada	1961	2,604	6,430

=== Prince Edward Island ===
As of July 2025 there is one Migratory Bird Sanctuary on Prince Edward Island.

Name	Year established	Area	
Name	Year established	ha	acre
Black Pond	1936	130	320

=== Quebec ===
As of July 2025 there are twenty-eight Migratory Bird Sanctuaries in Quebec.

Name	Year established	Area	
Name	Year established	ha	acre
Baie de Brador	1925	567	1,400
Baie des Loups	1925	3,610	8,900
Betchouane	1925	492	1,220
Bird Rocks	1919	648	1,600
Boatswain Bay	1941	15,465	38,210
Bonaventure Island and Percé Rock	1919	1,361	3,360
Cap-Saint-Ignace	1986	131	320
Carillon Island	1931	455	1,120
Gros-Mécatina	1996	2,168	5,360
Île à la Brume	1925	3,789	9,360
Île aux Basques	1927	840	2,100
Île aux Hérons	1937	631	1,560
Île du Corossol	1937	364	900
Îles de la Couvée	1986	15	37
Îles de la Paix	1972	1,092	2,700
L'Isle-Verte	1986	376	930
L'Islet	1986	59	150
Mont Saint-Hilaire	1960	985	2,430
Montmagny	1986	122	300
Nicolet	1982	2,937	7,260
Philipsburg	1955	527	1,300
Saint-Augustin	1925	5,369	13,270
Saint-Omer	1986	56	140
Saint-Vallier	1986	356	880
Sainte-Marie Islands	1925	3,980	9,800
Senneville	1936	555	1,370
Trois-Saumons	1986	157	390
Watshishou	1925	10,673	26,370

=== Saskatchewan ===
As of July 2025 there are fifteen Migratory Bird Sanctuaries in Saskatchewan.

Name	Year established	Area	
Name	Year established	ha	acre
Basin and Middle Lakes	1925	4,991	12,330
Duncairn Reservoir	1948	1,615	3,990
Indian Head	1924	32	79
Last Mountain Lake	1921	4,843	11,970
Lenore Lake	1925	10,331	25,530
Murray Lake	1948	1,589	3,930
Neely Lake	1952	502	1,240
Old Wives Lake	1925	32,391	80,040
Opuntia Lake	1952	1,391	3,440
Redberry Lake	1925	5,271	13,020
Scent Grass Lake	1948	647	1,600
Sutherland	1924	130	320
Upper Rousay Lake	1948	573	1,420
Val Marie Reservoir	1948	431	1,070
Wascana Lake	1956	117	290

== Territories ==
=== Northwest Territories ===
As of July 2025 there are five Migratory Bird Sanctuaries in the Northwest Territories.

Name	Year established	Area	
Name	Year established	ha	acre
Anderson River Delta	1961	118,402	292,580
Banks Island No. 1	1961	2,019,997	4,991,520
Banks Island No. 2	1961	14,302	35,340
Cape Parry	1961	227	560
Kendall Island	1961	61,241	151,330

=== Nunavut ===
As of August 2025 there are nine Migratory Bird Sanctuaries in Nunavut.

Name	Year established	Area	
Name	Year established	ha	acre
Ahiak (Queen Maud Gulf)	1961	6,292,818	15,549,890
Akimiski Island	1941	353,421	873,320
Akpaqarvik (Prince Leopold Island)	1992	30,399	75,120
Bylot Island	1965	1,282,731	3,169,700
Ikkattuaq (Harry Gibbons)	1959	143,811	355,360
Isulijarniq (Dewey Soper)	1957	816,599	2,017,860
Kuugaarjuk (McConnell River)	1960	36,803	90,940
Naujavaat (Seymour Island)	1975	5,302	13,100
Qaqsauqtuuq (East Bay)	1959	112,826	278,800

=== Yukon ===
There are no Migratory Bird Sanctuaries in the Yukon Territory.

== See also ==
- List of National Wildlife Areas in Canada
- List of Canadian protected areas
