= Victoria Harbour Migratory Bird Sanctuary =

Migratory bird sanctuary in Canada

- VHMBS
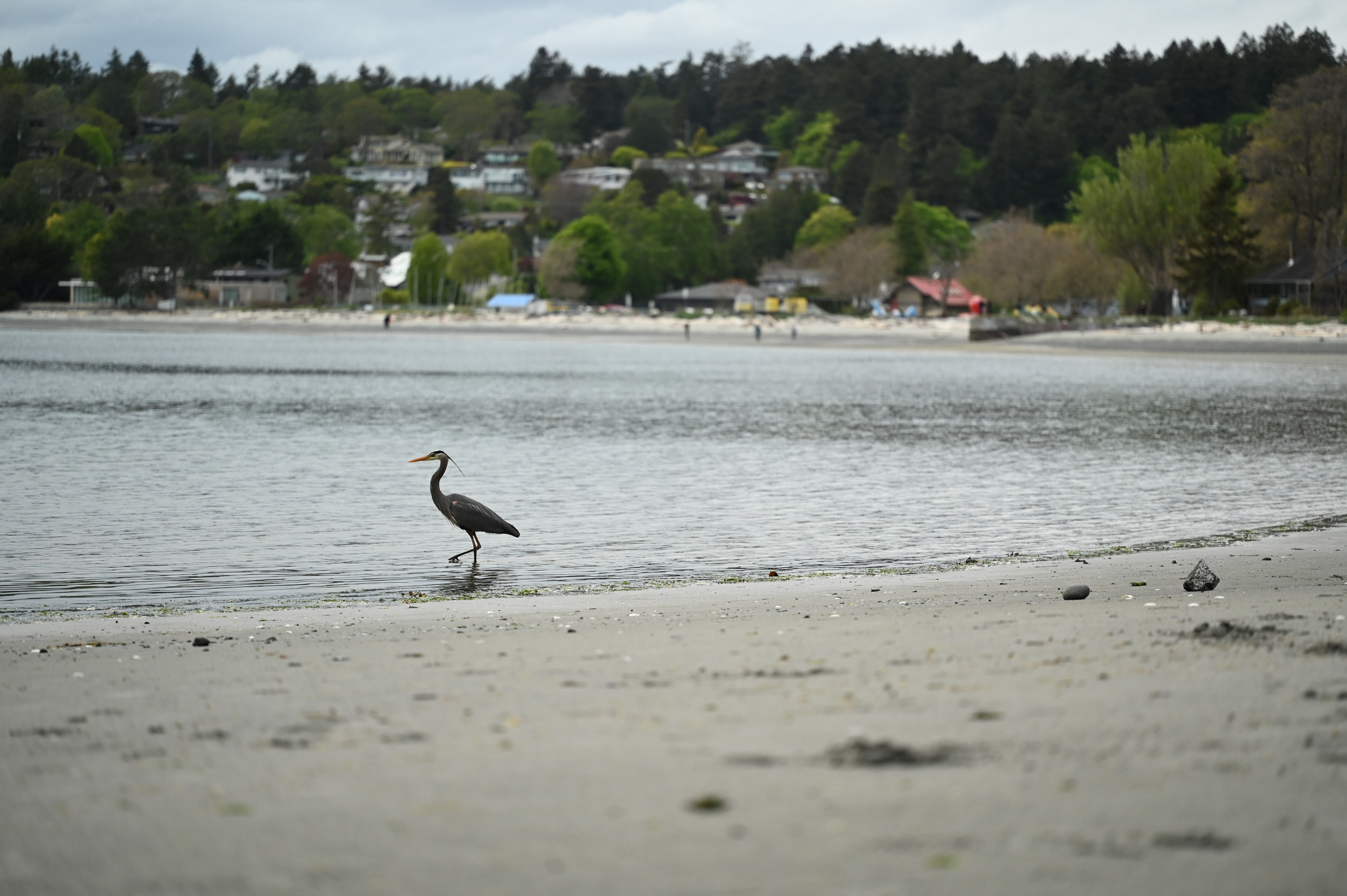
- A Pacific great blue heron at Cadboro Bay beach, part of the Victoria Harbour Migratory Bird Sanctuary

- Location within Vancouver Island
- Location: Greater Victoria, Salish Sea, British Columbia, Canada
- Nearest city: Victoria, British Columbia, Canada
- Coordinates: 48.40°N 123.33°W
- Length: 30 kilometres
- Area: 1,841 ha (7.11 sq mi)
- Designation: Migratory Bird Sanctuary
- Established: October 27, 1923
- Governing body: Canadian Wildlife Service
- Website: Victoria Harbour Migratory Bird Sanctuary

The Victoria Harbour Migratory Bird Sanctuary or VHMBS is a 30 km protected area on the southern tip of Vancouver Island, Canada, in the Greater Victoria metropolitan area. It is located within the traditional territory of the Lekwungen People. The sanctuary is federally recognized as a critical habitat for bird conservation, and is home to an estimated 270 bird species, many of which are migratory. The sanctuary encompasses about 30 kilometres of coastline, an area covering approximately 1841 hectares (4549 acres) in total. Of this total, 31 hectares are terrestrial, and 1810 hectares are marine.

== History ==
The VHMBS was established on October 27 1923 under the Migratory Birds Convention Act in response to a significant decline in bird populations caused by over-hunting. Today, it remains an important area for bird conservation. In 2023, the sanctuary celebrated its centennial anniversary.

== Plants and wildlife ==
The VHMBS contains more than 75 plants and animals that are of both federal and provincial conservation concern. The sanctuary provides habitat for an estimated 270 bird species, fifteen of which are listed under the Species at Risk Act.

=== Species at risk ===
==== Birds ====
- Ancient murrelet
- Band-tailed pigeon
- Barn swallow
- Buff-breasted sandpiper
- Cassin's auklet
- Pacific great blue heron (Ardea herodias fannini)
- Horned grebe
- Marbled murrelet
- Olive-sided flycatcher
- Peregrine falcon
- Red knot
- Red-necked phalarope
- Short-eared owl
- Vesper sparrow
- Western grebe

==== Mammals ====
- Grey whale
- Harbour porpoise
- Humpback whale
- Killer whale (Southern resident population and transient population)
- Sea otter
- Steller sea lion

==== Molluscs ====
- Northern abalone
- Olympia oyster

==== Plants ====
- Bear's-foot sanicle
- Bearded owl-clover
- California buttercup
- Coast microseris
- Coastal Scouler's catchfly
- Dense-flowered lupine
- Foothill sedge
- Golden paintbrush
- Macoun's meadowfoam
- Muhlenberg's centaury
- Purple sanicle
- Rosy owl-clover
- Seaside birds-foot lotus
- Tall woolly-heads
- Victoria's owl-clover
- White-top aster

== See also ==
- List of Migratory Bird Sanctuaries of Canada
- Esquimalt Lagoon Migratory Bird Sanctuary
- List of protected areas of British Columbia
- List of National Wildlife Areas in Canada
- List of Canadian protected areas
- Endangered species in Canada
