= Killdeer =

- Killdeer in breeding plumage

Conservation status
- Near Threatened (IUCN 3.1)

Scientific classification
- Kingdom: Animalia
- Phylum: Chordata
- Class: Aves
- Order: Charadriiformes
- Family: Charadriidae
- Genus: Charadrius
- Species: C. vociferus

Binomial name
- Charadrius vociferus Linnaeus, 1758
- Breeding range Resident range Non-breeding range

Audio

Shorebird found in the Americas

The killdeer (Charadrius vociferus) is a large plover found in the Americas. Its shrill, two-syllable call is often heard, sounding like "kill deer". It was described and given its current scientific name in 1758 by Carl Linnaeus in the 10th edition of his Systema Naturae. Three subspecies are described. Its upperparts are mostly brown with rufous fringes, the head has patches of white and black, and two black bands cross the breast. The belly and the rest of the breast are white. The nominate (or originally described) subspecies breeds from southeastern Alaska and southern Canada to Mexico. It is seen year-round in the southern half of its breeding range; the subspecies C. v. ternominatus is resident in the West Indies, and C. v. peruvianus inhabits Peru and surrounding South American countries throughout the year. North American breeders winter from their resident range south to Central America, the West Indies, and the northernmost portions of South America.

The nonbreeding habitat of the killdeer includes coastal wetlands, beach habitats, and coastal fields. Its breeding grounds are generally open fields with short vegetation (but locations such as rooftops are sometimes used); although it is a shorebird, it does not necessarily nest close to water. The nest itself is a scrape lined with vegetation and white material, such as pebbles or seashell fragments. This bird lays a clutch of four to six buff to beige eggs with dark markings. The breeding season (starting with egg-laying) occurs from mid-March to August, with later timing of egg-laying in the northern portion of the range. Both parents incubate the eggs for 22 to 28 days typically. The young stay in the nest until the day after being hatched, when they are led by their parents to a feeding territory (generally with dense vegetation where hiding spots are abundant), where the chicks feed themselves. The young then fledge about 31 days after hatching, and breeding first occurs after one year of age.

The killdeer primarily feeds on insects, although other invertebrates and seeds are eaten. It forages almost exclusively in fields, especially those with short vegetation and with cattle and standing water. It primarily forages during the day, but in the nonbreeding season, when the moon is full or close to full, it forages at night, likely because of increased insect abundance and reduced predation during the night. Predators of the killdeer include various birds and mammals. Its multiple responses to predation range from calling to the "ungulate display", which can be fatal for the performing individual. The killdeer was formerly considered a least-concern species by the IUCN due to its large range and population, but is now considered a near-threatened species due to its population decline, though the decline is not rapid enough to warrant uplisting the killdeer to a vulnerable species. It is protected by the American Migratory Bird Treaty Act of 1918 and the Canadian Migratory Birds Convention Act.

== Etymology and taxonomy ==
The killdeer was described in 1758 by Swedish naturalist Carl Linnaeus in the 10th edition of his Systema Naturae as Charadrius vociferus, its current scientific name. Linnaeus' description was based on a 1731 account of it by English naturalist Mark Catesby in his The Natural History of Carolina, Florida and the Bahama Islands, where he called it the "chattering plover". The genus name Charadrius is Late Latin for a yellowish bird mentioned in the fourth-century Vulgate Bible. This word derives from the Ancient Greek kharadrios, a bird found in ravines and river valleys (kharadra, "ravine"). The specific name vociferus is Latin, coming from vox, "cry", and ferre, "to bear".

Three subspecies are described:

- C. v. vociferus Linnaeus, 1758 – The nominate subspecies (originally described subspecies), it is found in the US (including southeastern Alaska), southern Canada, Mexico, and with some less widespread grounds further south, to Panama. It winters to northwestern South America.
- C. v. ternominatus Bangs & Kennard, 1920 – This subspecies is found on the Bahamas, the Greater Antilles, and Virgin Islands.
- C. v. peruvianus (Chapman, 1920) (Note: Originally described as Oxyechus vociferus peruvianus.) – This South American subspecies is found in western Ecuador, Peru, and extreme northwest Chile.

The killdeer's call resembles the phrase "kill deer", for which the species is named.

== Description ==
The killdeer is a tall and slender plover, with a relatively long tail. Adults ranging in length from 20 to 28 cm (7.9 to 11.0 in), having a wingspan between 59 and 63 cm (23 and 25 in), and usually being between 72 and 121 g (2.5 and 4.3 oz) in weight. It has a short, thick, and dark bill, flesh-colored legs, and a red eye ring.

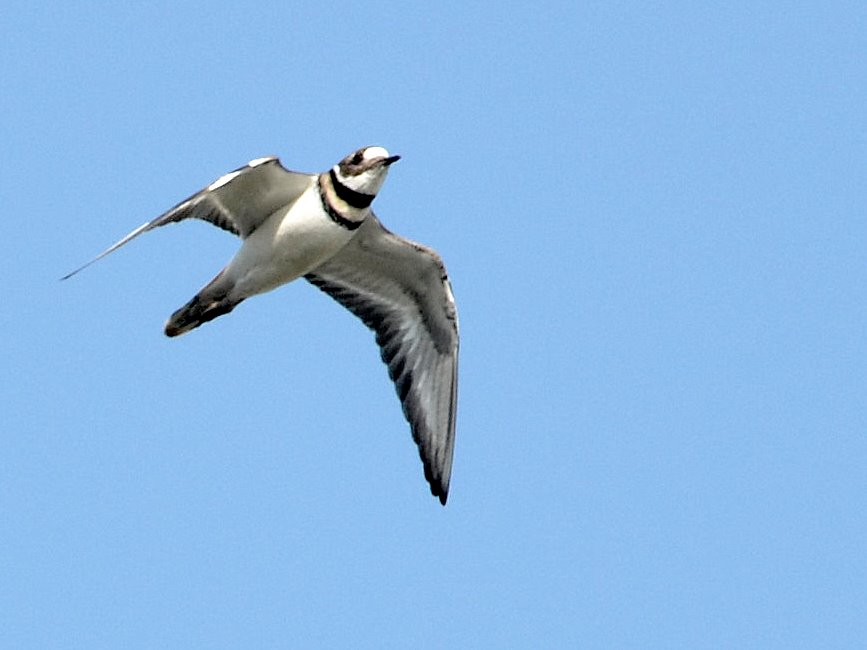
In flight

Its upper parts are mostly brown with rufous fringes, its cap, back, and wings being the former color. It has a white forehead and a white stripe behind the eye, and its lores and the upper borders to the white forehead are black. The killdeer also has a white collar with a black upper border. The rest of the face is brown. The breast and belly are white, except for two black breast bands. It is the only plover in North America with two breast bands. The rump is red, and the tail is mostly brown. The latter also has a black subterminal band, a white terminal band, and barred white feathers on the outer portion of the tail. A white wing stripe at the base of the flight feathers is visible in flight.

The female's mask and breast bands tend to be browner than those of the male. The adult of the subspecies C. v. ternominatus is smaller, paler, and greyer than the nominate. The subspecies C. v. peruvianus is smaller than the nominate and has more extensive rufous feather fringes. The juvenile is similar to the adult. The upper parts of the chicks are colored dusky and buff. Their underparts, forehead, neck, and chin are white, and they have a single band across their breast.

The killdeer is a vocal species, calling even at night. Its calls include nasal notes, like "deee", "tyeeee", and "kil-deee" (the basis of its common name). During display flights, it repeats a call of "kil-deer" or "kee-deeyu". When this plover is disturbed, it emits notes in a rapid sequence, such as "kee-di-di-di". Its alarm call is a long, fast trill.

== Habitat and distribution ==
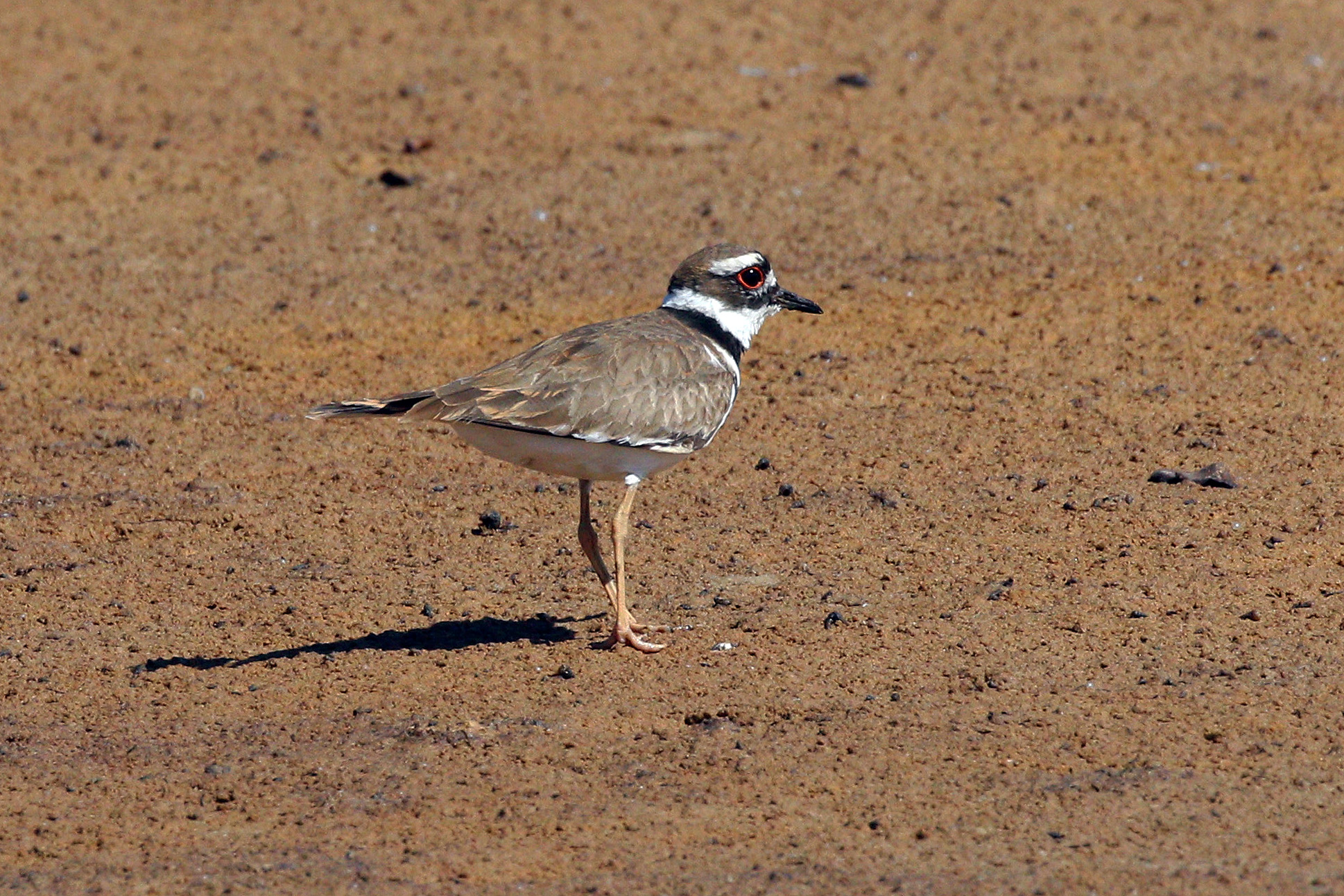
The subspecies C. v. ternominatus in Cuba

The nominate subspecies of the killdeer breeds in the US (including southeastern Alaska), southern Canada, and Mexico, with less widespread grounds further south, to Panama. Some northern populations are migratory. This bird is resident in the southern half of its breeding range, found throughout the year in most of the contiguous United States. It also winters south to Central America, the West Indies, Colombia, Ecuador, and islands off Venezuela, leaving its breeding grounds after mid-July, with migration peaking from August to September. Migration to the breeding grounds starts in February and ends in mid-May.

The subspecies C. v. ternominatus is thought to be resident in the Bahamas, Greater Antilles, and Virgin Islands. C. v. peruvianus is seen year-round in western Ecuador, Peru, and extreme northwestern Chile.

The killdeer uses beach habitats, coastal wetlands, and fields during the non-breeding season. It forages almost exclusively in these fields, especially those with short vegetation and with cattle (which likely shorten the vegetation) and standing water. When breeding, the killdeer has a home range of about 6 ha (15 acres), although this is generally larger when nesting more than 50 m (160 ft) away from water. Although generally a low-land species, it is found up to the snowline in meadows and open lakeshores during its autumn migration.

== Behavior ==
=== Breeding ===
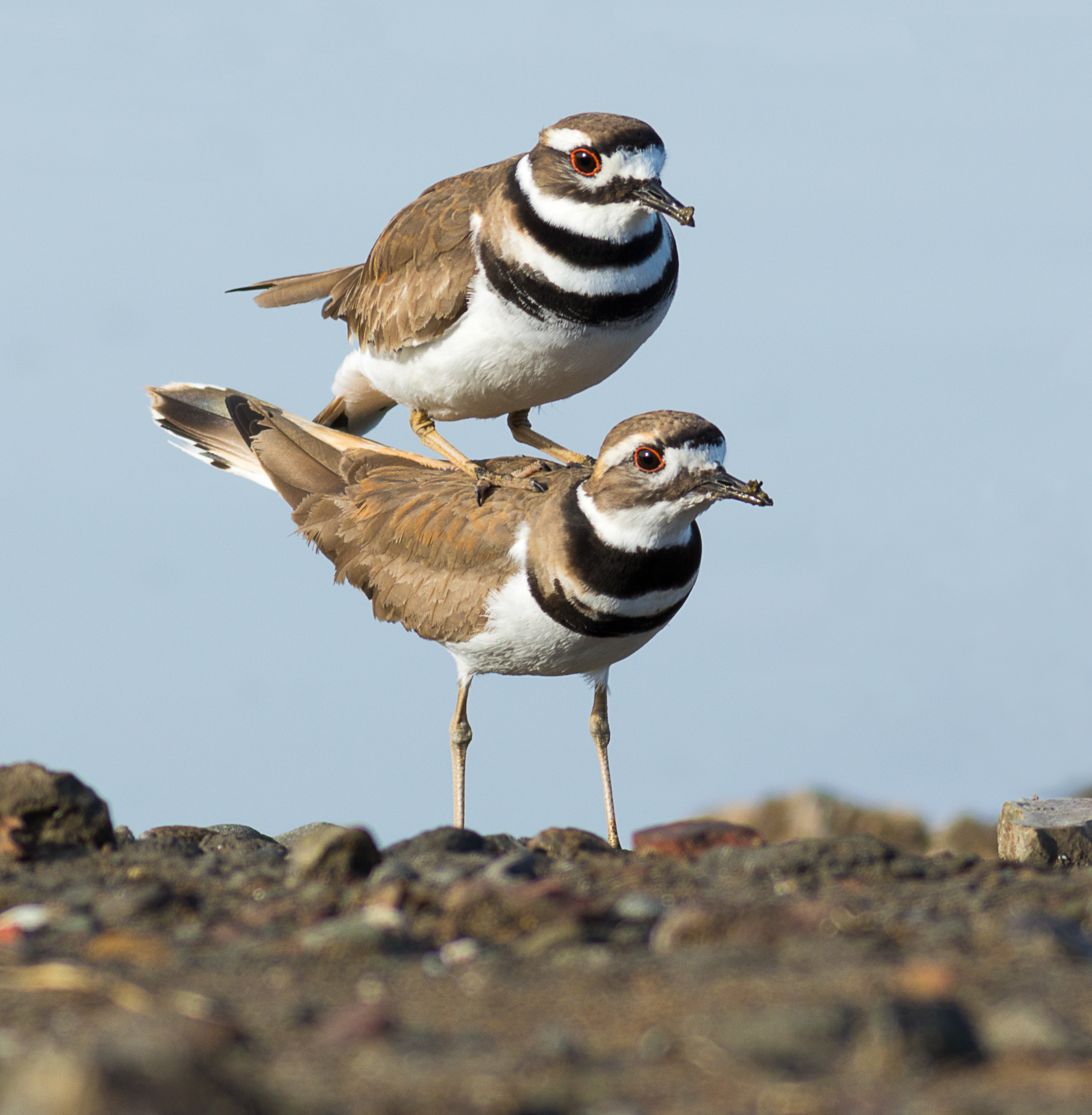
Copulation

The killdeer forms pairs on its breeding grounds right after arriving. Both sexes (although the male more often than the female) advertise in flight with loud "killdeer" calls. The male also advertises by calling from a high spot, scraping out a dummy nest, and with killdeer flights, where it flies with slow wingbeats across its territory. Ground chases occur when a killdeer has been approached multiple times by another killdeer; similarly, flight chases occur when an individual has been approached from the air. Both are forms of territorial defense.

The killdeer nests in open fields or other flat areas with short vegetation (usually below 1 cm (0.39 in) tall), such as agricultural fields and meadows. Nests are also sometimes located on rooftops. This plover frequently breeds close to where it bred the previous year. The male seems to usually renest in the same area regardless of whether or not he retains the same mate. This does not appear to be true of the female, which has been observed to not use the same territory if she does not have the same mate. The nest itself is merely a shallow depression or scrape in the ground, fringed by some stones and blades of grass. It is generally built with white nesting material instead of darker colors; the function of this is suspected to either help keep the nest cool or conceal it. In a study of piping plovers, the former function was supported, as nests were 2 °C (3.6 °F) to 6 °C (11 °F) cooler than the surrounding ground. The latter function also had some support, as the plovers generally chose pebbles closer in color to the eggs; nests that contrasted more with the ground suffered more predation. When nesting on rooftops, the killdeer may choose a flat roof, or build a nest of raised gravel, sometimes lined with white pebbles or pieces of seashells.

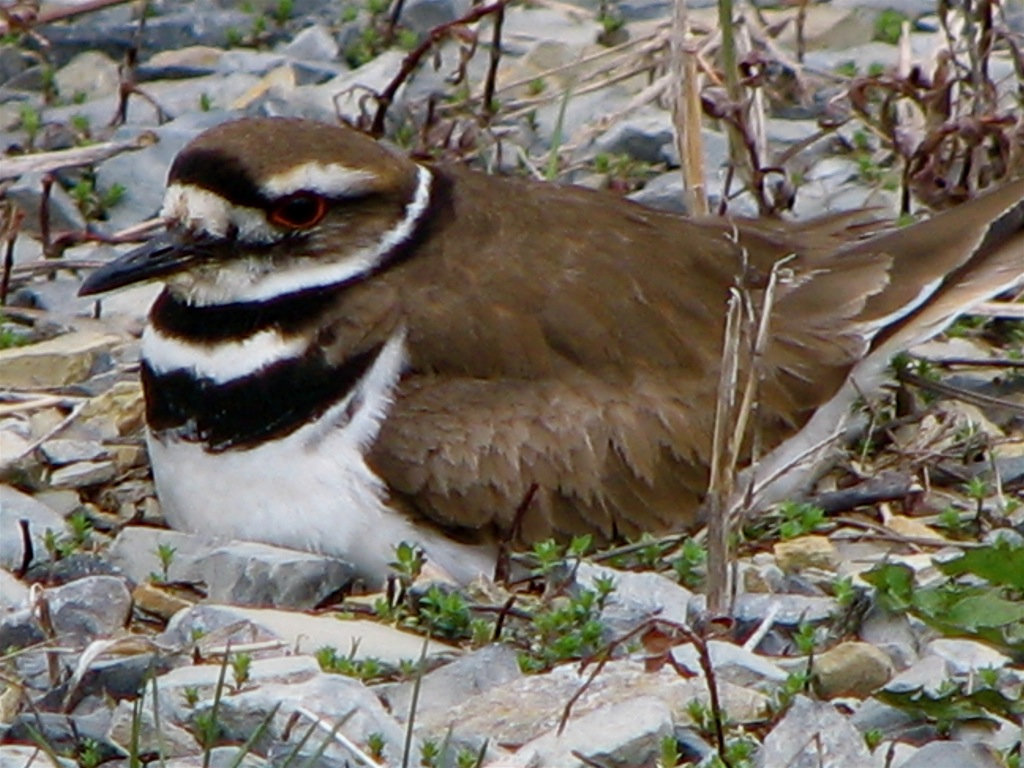
A female on a nest in Pennsylvania

The eggs of the killdeer are typically laid from mid-March to early June in the southern portion of the range, and from mid-April to mid-July in the northern part. In both cases, the breeding season itself extends to about August. In Puerto Rico, and possibly in other Caribbean islands, breeding occurs year-round.

The killdeer lays a clutch of four to six eggs that are buff to beige, with brown markings and black speckles. The eggs are about 38 by 27 mm (1.5 by 1.1 in) in size, and laid at intervals of 24 to 48 hours. The energy expenditure of both sexes is at its highest during egg-laying; the female needs to produce eggs, and the male needs to defend his territory. Both of the sexes are closer to the nest site than usual during egg-laying and incubation, although the male is generally closer than the female during all stages of breeding. This latter fact is likely due to the male's increased investment in nest-site defense. Up to five replacement clutches can be laid, and occasionally two broods occur. Second broods are usually laid in the nesting territory of the first brood. The eggs are incubated for 22 to 28 days by both the male and the female, with the former typically incubating at night. The time dedicated to incubation is related to temperature, with one study recording that killdeer incubated eggs 99% of the time when the temperature was about 13 °C (55 °F), 76% of the time around 26 °C (79 °F), and 87% of the time at about 35 °C (95 °F). When it is hot (above at least 25 °C (77 °F)), incubation cools the eggs, generally through shading by one of the parents.

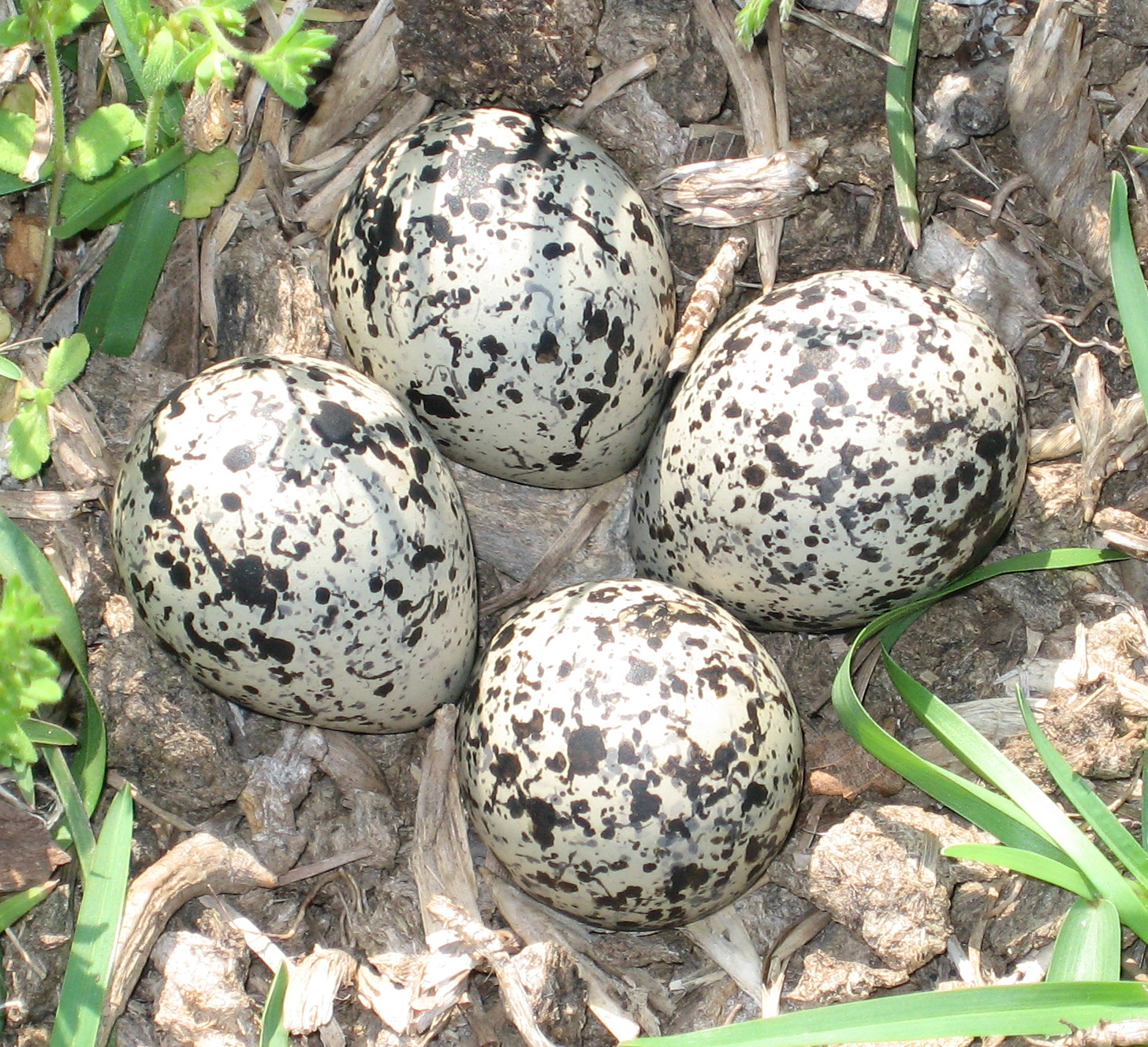
Eggs in a nest on the ground

About 53% of eggs are lost, mainly to predators. The young are precocial, starting to walk within the first days of their life. After they hatch, both parents lead them out of the nest, generally to a feeding territory with dense vegetation under which the chicks can hide when a predator is near. The chicks are raised, at least in single-brood pairs, by both parents, likely because of the high failure rate of nests and the need for both parents to be present to successfully raise the young. In these broods, the young are usually attended by one parent at a time (generally the female) until about two weeks of age, after which both parents are occasionally seen together with the chicks. Otherwise, the inattentive adult is at least about 23 m (75 ft) away from the chicks. Periods of attentiveness for each parent generally last from about one to one and a half hours. When the chicks are young, this is mainly spent standing; as the chicks get older, less time is dedicated to standing. When the young are below two weeks of age, the attending adult spends little time feeding; foraging time increases as the chicks grow. The inattentive adult defends the young most of the time when they are less than a week old, but this task steadily shifts onto the attentive adult, until about three weeks of age, when the attending parent does almost all of the defense. One parent at a time broods the chicks and does so frequently until they are two days old. The young are brooded during the day until about 15 days after hatching and during the night for about 18 days after hatching. The only time when they are not in the presence of a parent is when the parents are mating or responding to a predator or aggressive conspecific.

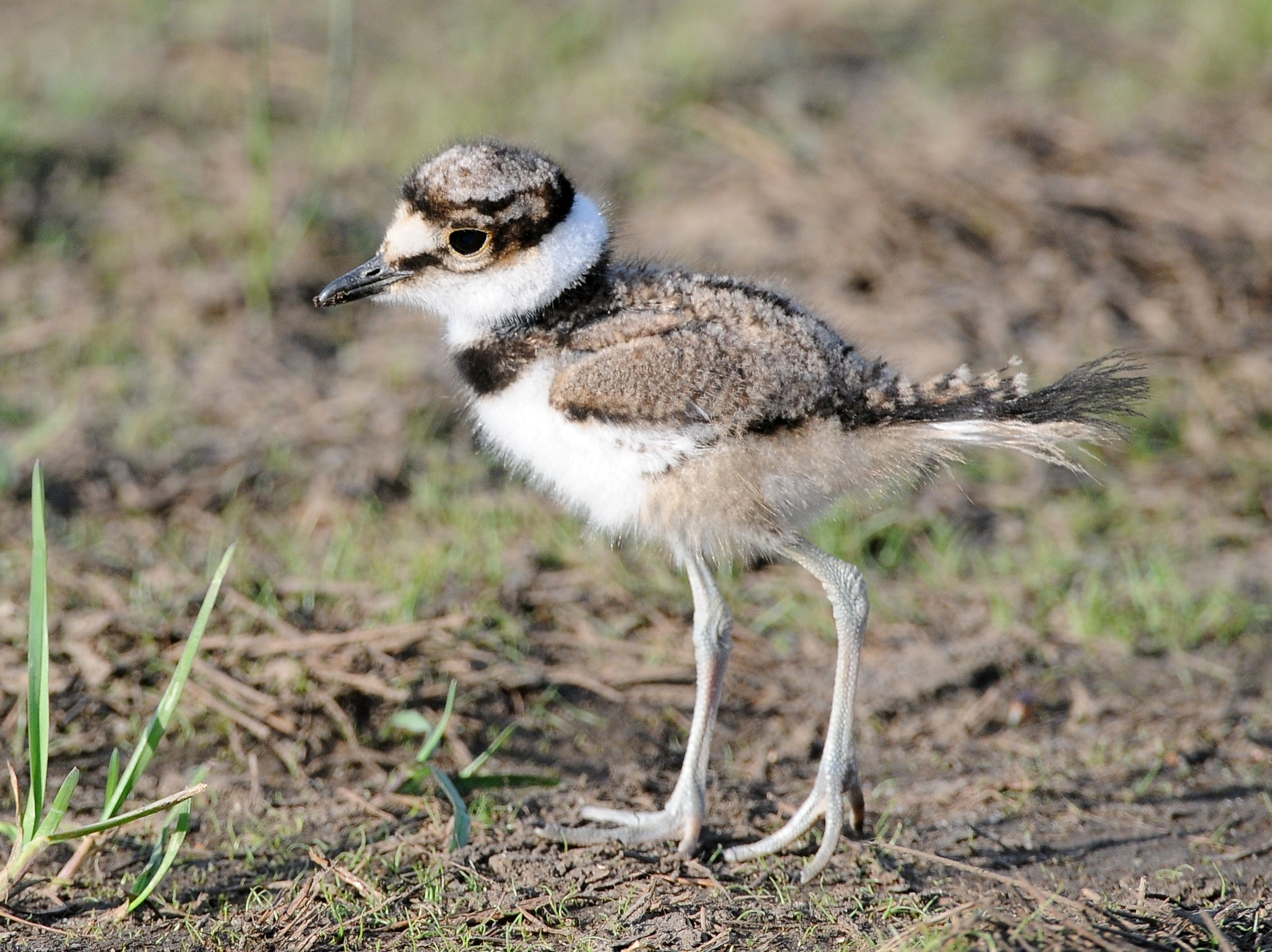
A chick in New Jersey

When a pair has two broods, the second is usually attended by just the male (which can hatch the eggs on his own, unlike the female). In this case, the male does not spend most of the time standing; the amount of time he does stand, though, stays constant as the chicks age. Like attentive adults in two-parent broods, the sole parent increases the time spent foraging as the young age.

The young fledge about 31 days after hatching, and generally move to moister areas in valleys and on the banks of rivers. They may be cared for by their parents for up to 10 days after they fledge, and exceptionally for 81 days after hatching. About 52 to 63% of nests fail to produce any fledged young. Breeding starts after one year of age. The killdeer has a maximum lifespan of 10 years and 11 months.

=== Feeding ===
The killdeer feeds primarily on insects (especially beetles and flies), in addition to millipedes, worms, snails, spiders, and some seeds. It opportunistically takes tree frogs and dead minnows. It forages almost exclusively in fields (no matter the tide), especially those with short vegetation and with cattle (which likely shorten the vegetation) and standing water. Standing water alone does not have a significant effect on field choice unless combined with cattle. Viable disseminules can be recovered from killdeer feces, indicating that this bird is important in transporting aquatic organisms.

The killdeer uses visual cues to forage. An example of this is "foot-trembling", where it stands on one foot, shaking the other in shallow water for about five seconds, pecking at any prey stirred up. When feeding in fields, it sometimes follows plows to take earthworms disturbed to the surface. The female forages significantly more than the male during most stages of breeding. The former feeds the most before and during egg-laying, the least when incubation starts (as little time to feed remains), with a return to high levels after. During the nonbreeding season, the killdeer forages during the night, depending on the lunar cycle. When the moon is full, it feeds more at night and roosts more during the day. Foraging at night has benefits for this bird, including increased insect abundance and reduced predation.

== Predators and parasites ==
The killdeer is parasitized by acanthocephalans, cestodes, nematodes, and trematodes. It is preyed upon by American herring gulls, common crows, raccoons, and striped skunks. The mentioned birds and other avian predators are the majority of predators in some areas during the breeding season. Predation is not limited to eggs and chicks: mustelids, for example, can kill incubating adults.

=== Responses to predators ===
The parents use various methods to distract predators during the breeding season. One method is the "broken-wing display", also known as "injury feigning". Before displaying, it usually runs from its nest, making alarm calls and other disturbances. When the bird has the attention of the predator, the former turns its tail towards the latter, displaying the threatening orange color of the rump. It then crouches, droops its wings, and lowers its tail, which is more common for them. With increasing intensity, the wings are held higher, the tail is fanned out, and the tail becomes more depressed. Another behavior that has received attention is the "ungulate display", where the adult raises its wings, exposes its rump, lowers its head, and charges at the intruder. This can be fatal to the displaying bird.

The broken-wing display

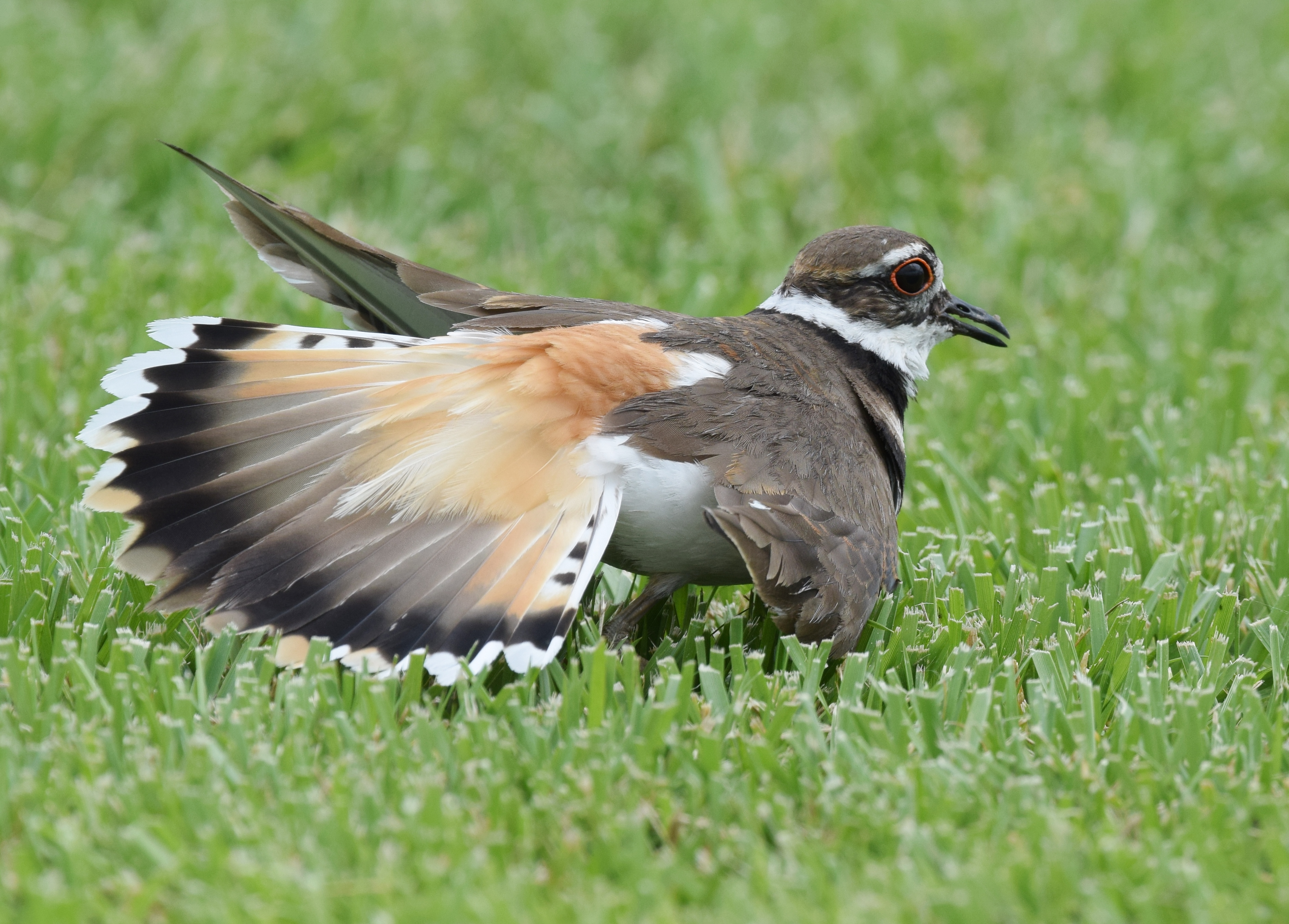

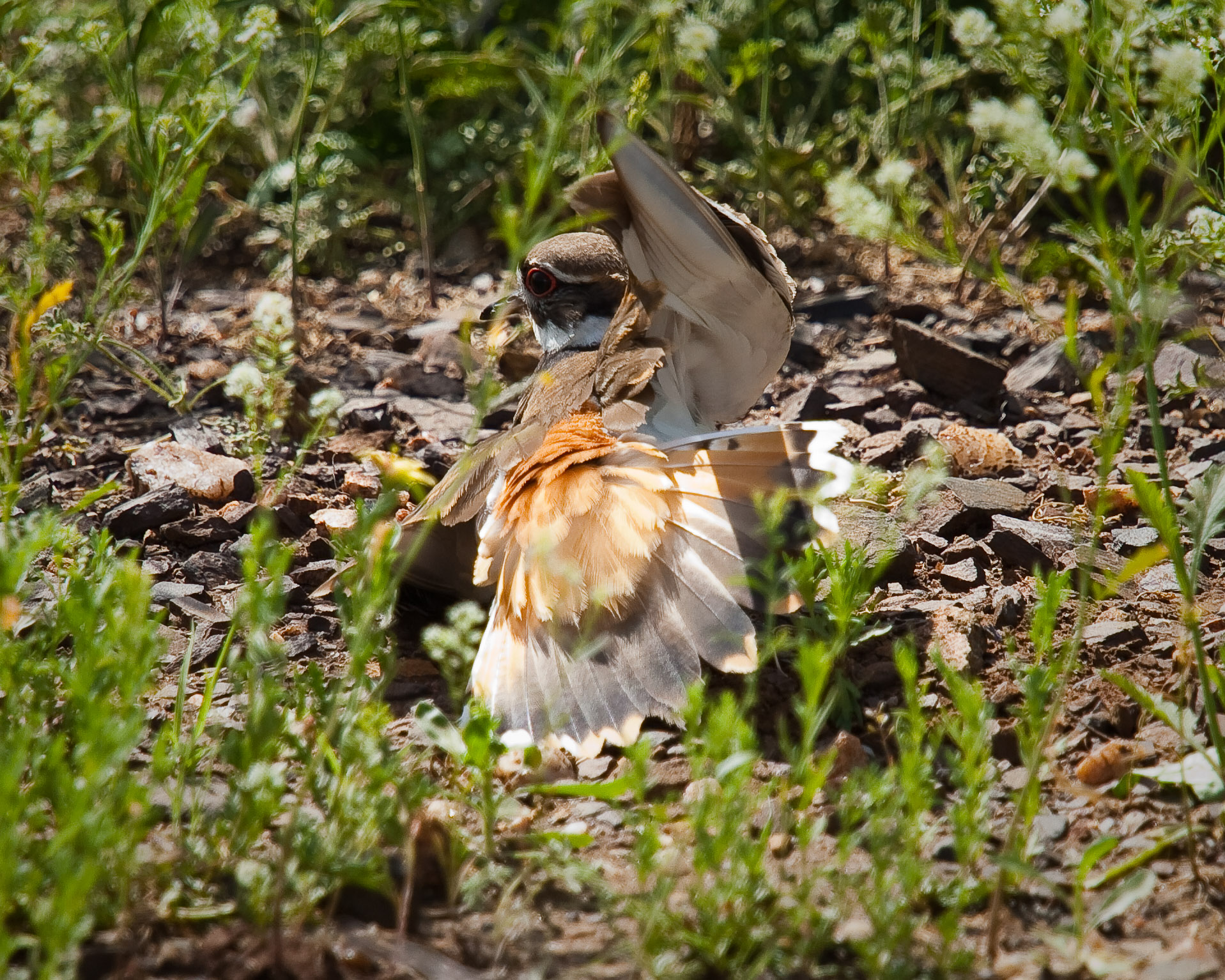

The intensity of the responses to predators varies throughout the breeding season. During egg-laying, the most common response to predators is to quietly leave the nest. As incubation starts and progresses, the intensity of predator responses increases, peaking after hatching. This is probably because it is worth more to protect the young then, as they are more likely to fledge. After hatching, reactions decrease in intensity, until a normal response is called. This is because the young become more independent as they age.

== Conservation status ==
The killdeer was formerly considered a least-concern species by the IUCN due to its large range of about 26.3 million km^{2} (10.2 million mi^{2}) and population, estimated by the IUCN to be about one million birds, or about two million, according to the Handbook of the Birds of the World Alive. As of 2024, it is considered a near-threatened species due to its population decline exceeding 20% in three generations, though the decline is not rapid enough to warrant uplisting the killdeer to a vulnerable species. It is protected in the US by the Migratory Bird Treaty Act of 1918, and in Canada by the Migratory Birds Convention Act.
