= Shoal Harbour Migratory Bird Sanctuary =

Migratory Bird Sanctuary in British Columbia, Canada

- Location within Vancouver Island Location within British Columbia
- Location: Sidney, British Columbia, Canada
- Coordinates: 48°40′20″N 123°24′39″W
- Area: 150 ha (370 acres)
- Designation: Migratory Bird Sanctuary
- Established: 1931
- Governing body: Canadian Wildlife Service

The Shoal Harbour Migratory Bird Sanctuary is a migratory bird sanctuary on Vancouver Island, British Columbia. More than 40 species of birds are found there.

There are marinas and boat moorings within the sanctuary and development on its shoreline. A ship partially sank in the bird sanctuary in 2022, raising concerns about environmental impacts to the wildlife there.

Among 92 MBS in Canada, Shoal Harbour MBC is 146 hectares big and one of the early establishments made under the Migratory Birds Convention Act. Migratory Birds Sanctuaries' main goal is to protect migratory birds from numerous threats and to provide a safe, warm shelter during winter when their habitats are mostly frozen. This is one of the implementations to accomplish the environmental missions that Environment and Climate Change Canada (ECCC) has called along with the Species at Risk Act to sustain biodiversity.

About 35-40 species of birds inhabit the Shoal harbour area. Three areas are composed of Shoal Harbour: Protected waters, Sidney Channel Bird Important Area, and Outer Coast. Each area has extinct characteristics, as particular species of birds are found in each sector. With IUCN(International Union for Conservation of Nature) evaluation, the birds are distinguished into not evaluated, data deficient, least concerned, near threatened, vulnerable, endangered, critically endangered, extinct in the wild, and extinct.

== History ==
Located close to the east part of the Saanich Peninsula on Vancouver Island, Shoal Harbour MBS was originally home to W̱sáneć (Saanich) people. W̱sáneć (Saanich), possessing a meaning of "raised up" in Saanich, are indigenous nations who lived across the San Juan Islands and along the eastern and northern shores of the Saanich Peninsula. As they lived close to the sea, the sea played a major role in hunting and fishing, as W̱sáneć people's lives as they call themselves as "salt water people".

On February 11, 1852, the Hudson's Bay Company and the W̱sáneć signed a treaty called 'Douglas Treaties' which outlined that the Hudson's Bay Company would protect W̱sáneć's territory. However, W̱sáneć thought this act was unfair since it meant 'surrender' and was also seen as a 'purchase agreement' to them. After two decades, in the early 1870s, British Columbia became part of Canada, and W̱sáneć people were forced to follow the Indian Act. Under the Indian Act, all Aboriginal/First Nations lost their freedom and rights. In the late 1870s, as the reserves were officially recognized as "Saanch Indians", they regained their original peninsula that had been under the Douglas Treaties.

From 1931 to 1954, colonial representatives took a vote to allocate the area for each W̱sáneć community. This led the W̱sáneć people to be divided up into four little communities: SȾÁ,UTW̱(Tsawout), W̱JOȽEȽP(Tsartlip), BOḰEĆEN (Puaquachin), and W̱SÍḴEM (Tseycum). Though they became separated and relocated to different sections, they still consider four communities as W̱sáneć people.

To provide W̱sáneć people with temporary reserves, W̱sáneć Land Trust Society was formed after their reallocation by the colonial representatives. W̱sáneć Land Trust Society aims to conserve both environment and culture including maintaining Shoal Harbour MBS.

== Geography ==
The sanctuary is about 30 kilometres from Victoria, the capital of British Columbia, with the nearest city being Sidney. It comprises several bays off of the Haro Strait in the Salish Sea, including Roberts Bay. It also consists of many small islands which become private stopover shelters for many migratory birds. The Shoal Harbour MBS is mostly covered with shallow water and partially covered with tidal flats. Some have rocky surfaces with gravel and silt, some have sand and some have intertidal mudflats. These mudflats are highly fruitful because of sea lettuce and eelgrass beds which feed many migratory birds. Also, during winter where every inland water is frozen, bays and mudflats become very significant habitats. The sanctuary is divided into several areas, including Roberts Bay, All Bay / Resthaven Park, Marina Park / Marina Shoreline, Blue Heron Basin and Tsehum Harbour Park / Westport Marina Shoreline. Some areas are filled with anchored boats and ports and are still going through increasing development of marinas which can cause disturbance to birds and other marine creatures.

=== Roberts Bay ===
Roberts Bay is an enclosed bay separated from other bays in SHMBS and located in the southern area of the sanctuary. Due to less marina development and more resources for birds to survive compared to the other areas, it is easy to observe almost half of all migratory birds, mostly dabbling and diving ducks, visiting SHMBS at Roberts Bay.

=== All Bay / Resthaven Park ===
Above Roberts Bay, All Bay has a very high density of marina and boats and there is a huge residential development near Resthaven Park as well. This area is quite popular with shorebirds due to the relatively large coverage of mudflats and abundant feed for them. However, compared to Roberts Bay, where there are fewer marina developments and pollution, a smaller number of migratory birds visit this area.

=== Other areas ===
Marina Shoreline is relatively more widely open and contains mostly parks and partially a gravel beach, and similar to All Bay, residential and marina developments go on, causing high boat traffic. Additionally, Tsehum Harbour and Blue Heron Basin undergo these developments, leading to having the lowest bird density during migration periods. These areas are not as suitable for birds as Roberts Bay due to pollution and high disturbance.

== Ecology ==
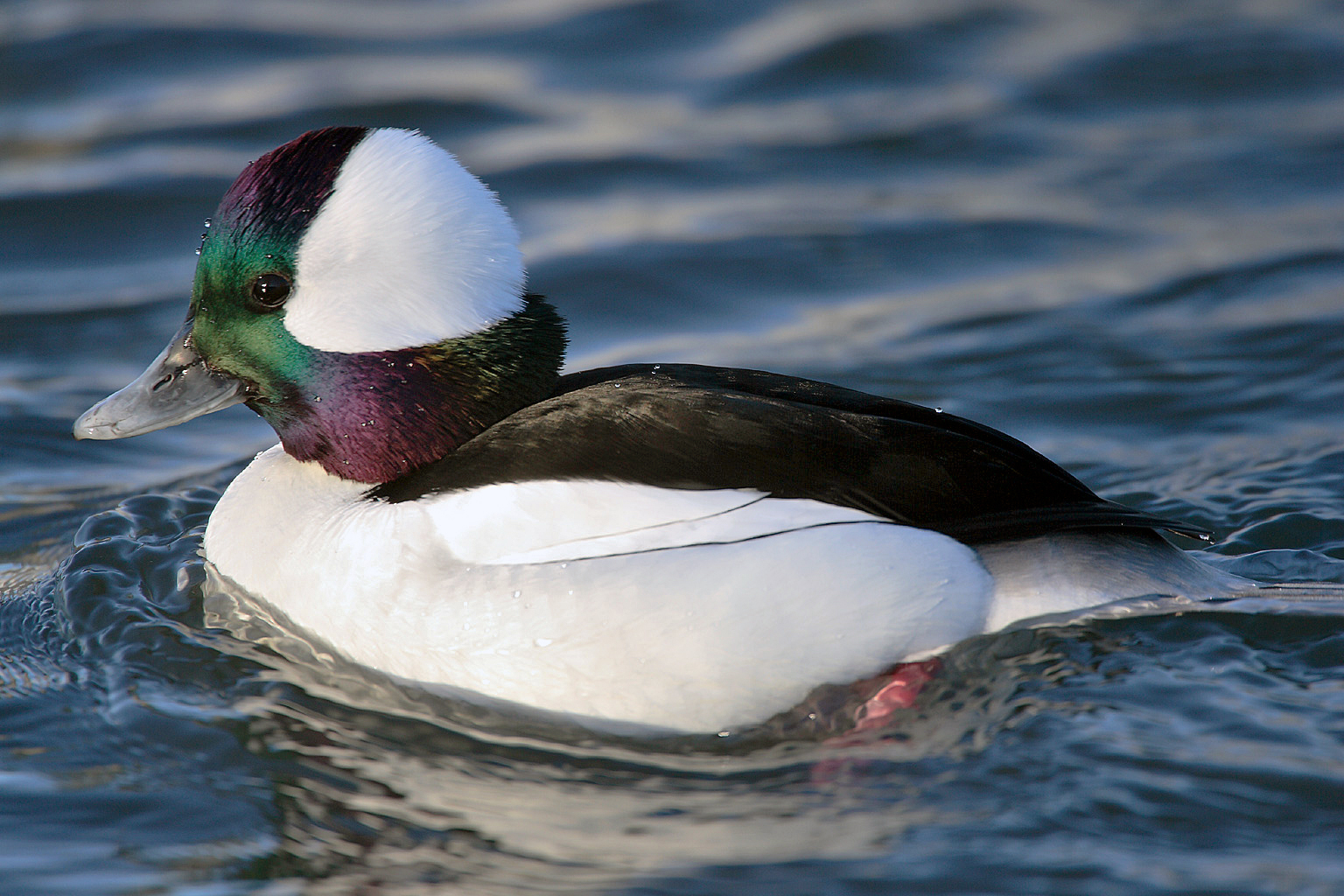
Bufflehead

=== Bufflehead (Bucephala albeola) ===
Bufflehead migrates short distances, and breeds mainly occur in Alaska, British Columbia, Alberta, and Saskatchewan. Their habitat is forest, wetlands, marine neritic, marine coastal/supratidal. Their nesting begins usually in late April and late May and ends in early July and mid-July. Their lifespan is average of 15 years, and the size is 32–40 cm (13–16 in). However, due to the loss of trees due to agricultural expansion, Bufflehead is losing its nesting place. Also, it occurs in Manitoba, Ontario, and Quebec. The population began to increase in the 1960s. Since 1970, the population of this species had a large increase, which made the current population considered stable and acceptable. Bufflehead was considered a "Priority Species" in the Bird Conservation Region Strategy in 2013. In 2015, Wild Species (Canada) presented that Bufflehead is in secure status. Later in 2018, the IUCN (International Union Conservative of Nature) stated that bufflehead is considered a "least concern" species. The most current estimated population number of mature bufflehead is 1,300,000 in 2020.

=== Horned grebe (Podiceps auritus) ===
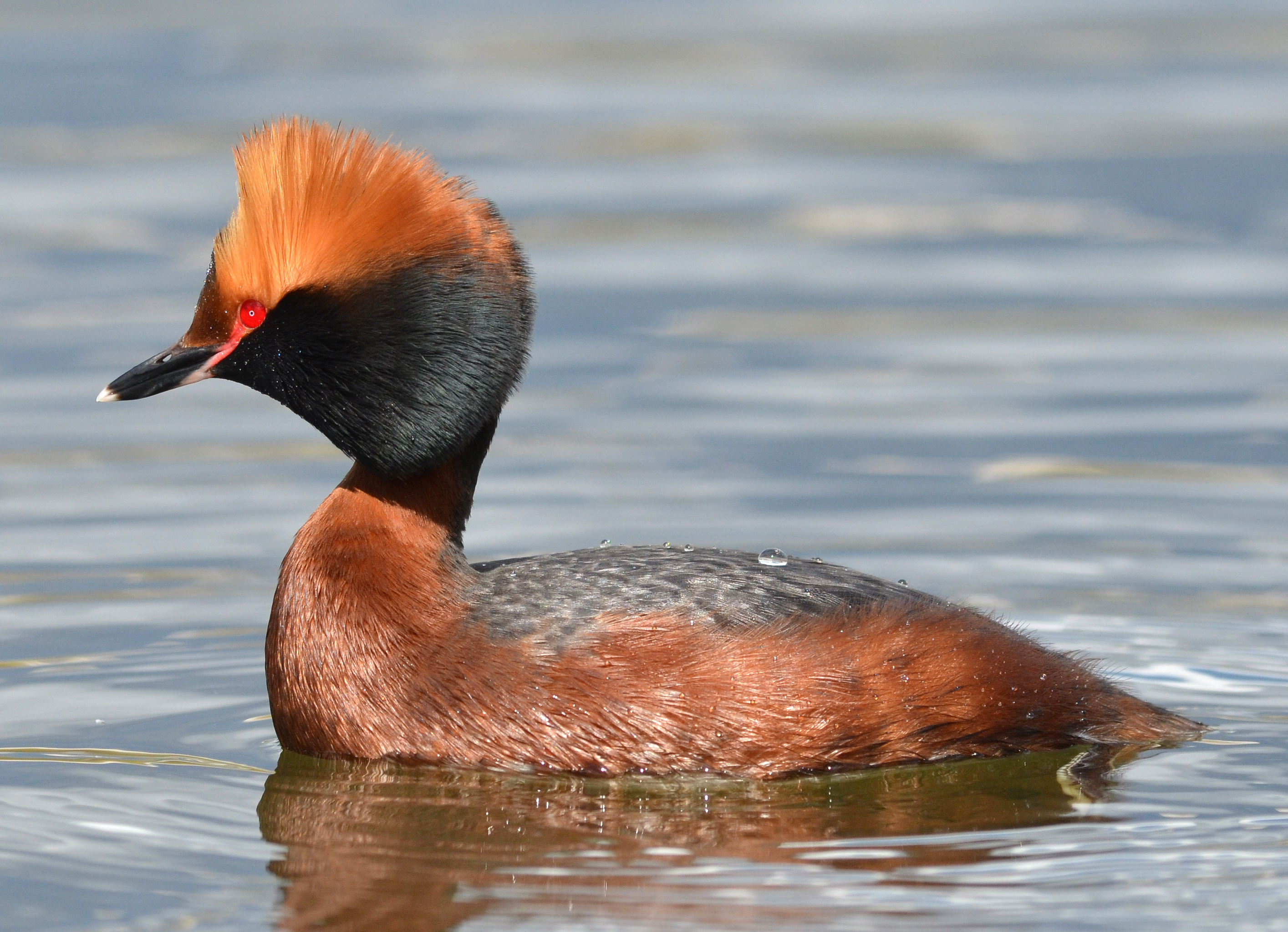
Horned grebe

Horned grebe is a short-distance migrator, which lives in ponds and lakes in western and northern Canada. There is a small population of Horned Grebe in the Gulf of St.Lawrence. The lifespan of horned grebe is average 5 years, and its size is 31–38 centimetres (12–15 in) and 44–46 centimetres (17–18 in) wingspan. Its habitat is threatened by agriculture development, and bird itself is threatened by human's fishing net. To save this bird, The Migratory Bird Convention Act (1994) is made to help protecting the ecosystem. In 2009, COSEWIC (Canada) designated the horned grebe as an endangered species from the Magdalen Islands and considered it a special concern species in the Western part of Canada. Also, in 2011 SARA (Canada) announced this species as endangered. Later in 2018, IUCN (Global) designated it as a vulnerable species. Starting from 1970, horned grebe had a large decrease in population which led to a "not acceptable" level of population. The current estimated population number is 239,000–583,000 in 2012.

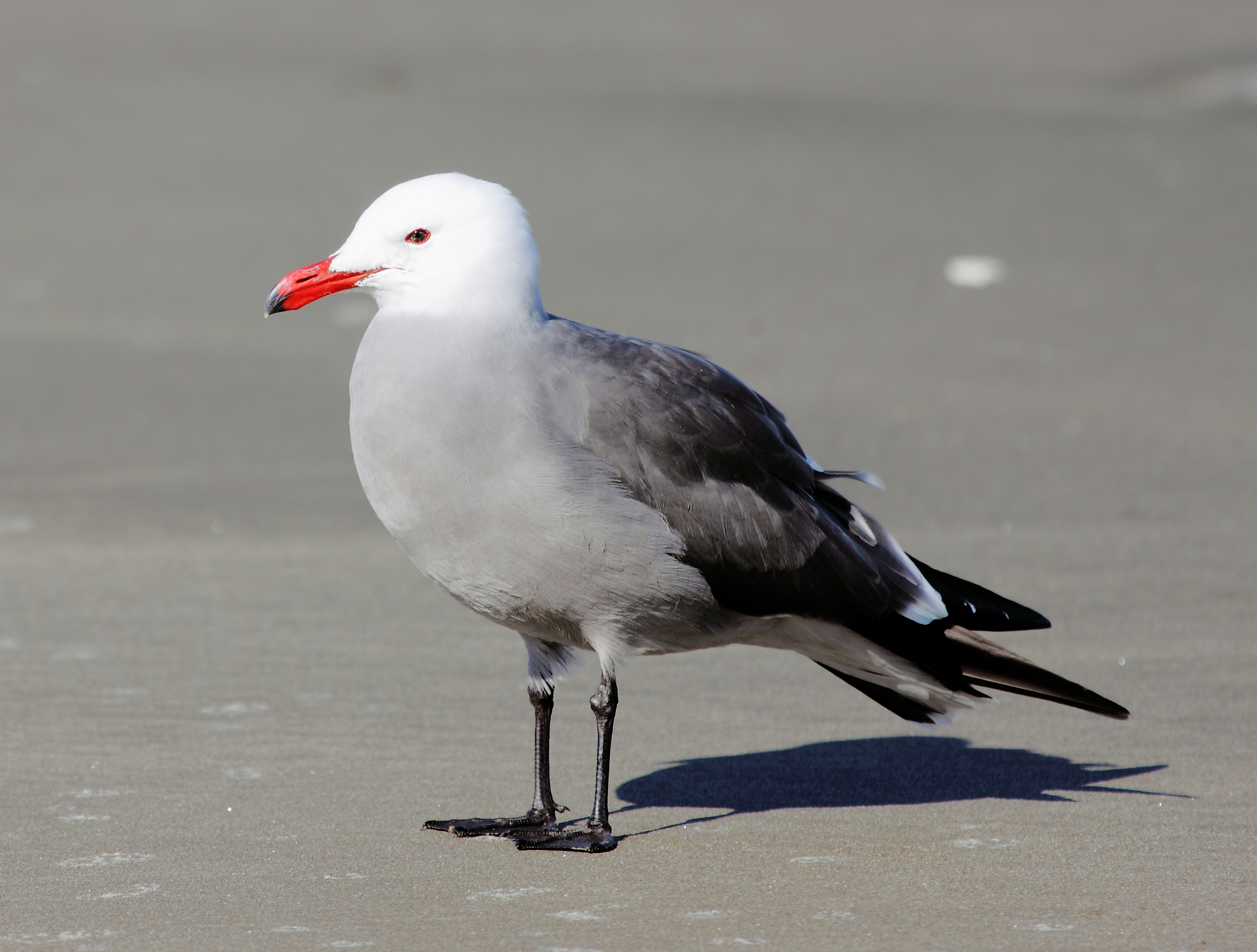
Heermann's gull

=== Heermann's gull (Larus heermanni) ===
Heermann's gull is a seasonal visitor, which means it is a visitor during one or more seasons but does not breed in Canada. It breeds in the Gulf of California, Mexico, and Southern California. This species migrates northward to the coast of North America, this is called "reverse" migration. Canada does not monitor the exact population for Heermann's gull because there was only a small number of changes in Canada's population. According to Bird Count Data from the United States, this species' population has a large increase in the continental population. Heermann's gull was selected to be on the watch list from the State of North America's Birds. Also, the Partners in Flight (North America) selected this species in the watch list - yellow R, which means the population is stable and increasing. However, IUCN designated this species as "Near Threatened" in 2018. The population estimate for Heermann's Gull is not yet available in Canada. The estimated population of mature Heermann's Gull was 350,000 in 2019.

=== Other birds observed in Migratory Bird Sanctuary ===
| | LC - Increasing | LC - stable | LC - Decreasing | Other or unknown status |
|---|---|---|---|---|
| Protected waters | Bufflehead; Green-winged teal; Bald eagle; Osprey; Great blue heron; Mallard | Common goldeneye | American wigeon; Merganser | |
| Outer coast | Harlequin duck; Black oystercatcher; Glaucous-winged gull; Bonaparte's gull; Laughing gull | Black turnstone | Eurasian wigeon; Grey plover; California gull | Heermann's gull: Near Threatened (NT) - Unknown; Mew gull: Least Concern (LC) - Unknown |
| Sidney Channel Important Bird Area | Common murre | Pigeon guillemot; Brant goose | Rhinoceros auklet; Grebe; Loons; Brandt's cormorant; Surf scoter | Long-tailed duck: Vulnerable (VU - decreasing) |
