= Saskatoon Lake (Alberta) =

Lake in Alberta, Canada

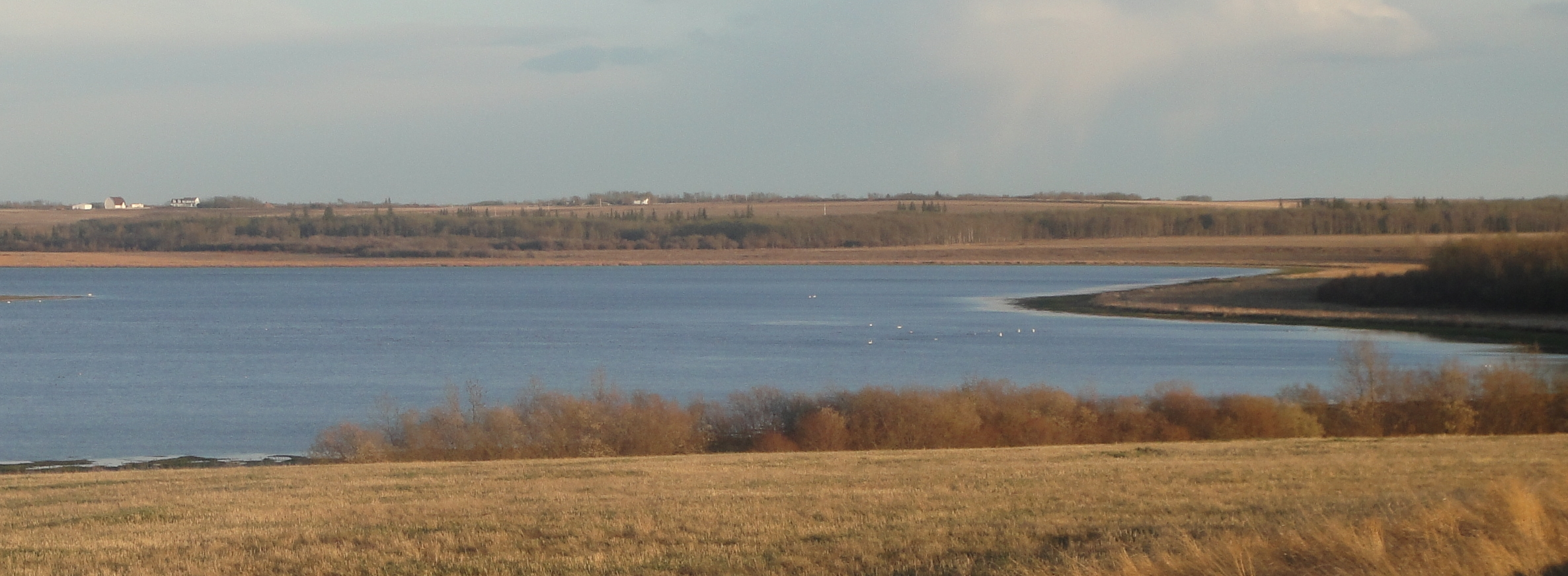
- Saskatoon Lake with Saskatoon Island Provincial Park in background

- Location within Alberta
- Location: County of Grande Prairie No. 1, Alberta
- Coordinates: 55°13′11″N 119°05′34″W
- Basin countries: Canada
- Max. length: 2.9 km (1.8 mi)
- Max. width: 4.3 km (2.7 mi)
- Surface area: 7.47 km^{2} (2.88 sq mi)
- Average depth: 2.6 m (8 ft 6 in)
- Max. depth: 4 m (13 ft)
- Surface elevation: 714 m (2,343 ft)
- References: Saskatoon Lake

Saskatoon Lake is a lake in Alberta.

Saskatoon Island Provincial Park is located on a former island of the lake, which now connects the western and eastern shores following a drop in the lake's water level.

The lake is designated as a federal migratory bird sanctuary.

== See also ==
- Lakes of Alberta
