= Saskatoon Island Provincial Park =

Provincial park in Alberta, Canada

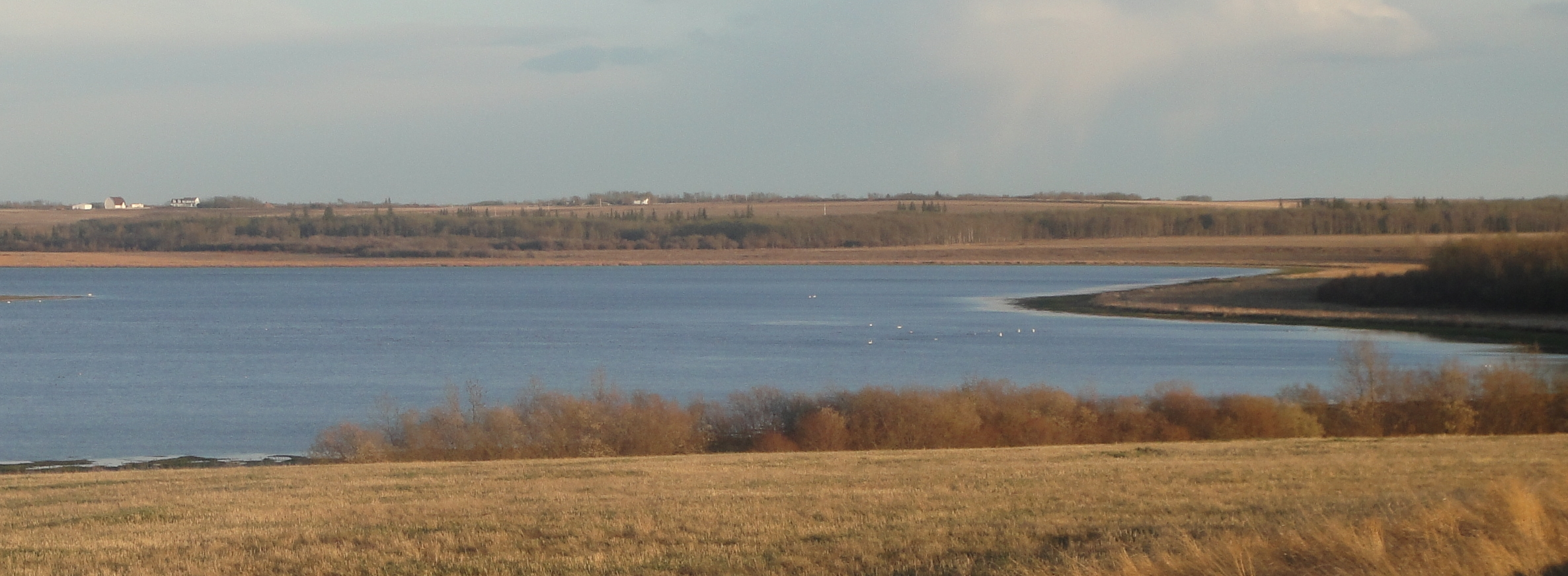
- Saskatoon Lake

- Location within Alberta
- Interactive map of Saskatoon Island Provincial Park
- Location: County of Grande Prairie No. 1, Peace River Country; Alberta; Canada
- Nearest city: Grande Prairie
- Coordinates: 55°12′14″N 119°05′08″W
- Area: 1.2 km^{2} (0.46 sq mi)
- Established: 21 November 1932
- Governing body: Alberta Tourism, Parks and Recreation
- Website: Saskatoon Island

Saskatoon Island Provincial Park is a provincial park located in northern Alberta, Canada. It is located 20 kilometers (12 mi) west of Grande Prairie in the Peace River Country, on the southern shore of Saskatoon Lake.

== History ==
The park takes its name from a large island that was once in the middle of the lake, where Cree natives would pick saskatoon berries to use in pemmican. The island merged to the adjacent plains when the water level dropped in 1919, and the lake was divided into two sections.

A settlement was established on the north side of the lake. The community of Lake Saskatoon was incorporated as a village in 1912. It was eventually abandoned after 1924, when the Grande Prairie-Grande Cache Railway missed the settlement by 9 kilometers (5.6 mi) when it was constructed on a more southern route through Wembley instead.

A provincial park was created on the spit of land dividing the two parts of the lake. It was established on November 21, 1932.

The area was declared a Federal Migratory Bird Sanctuary in 1948.

== Conservation ==
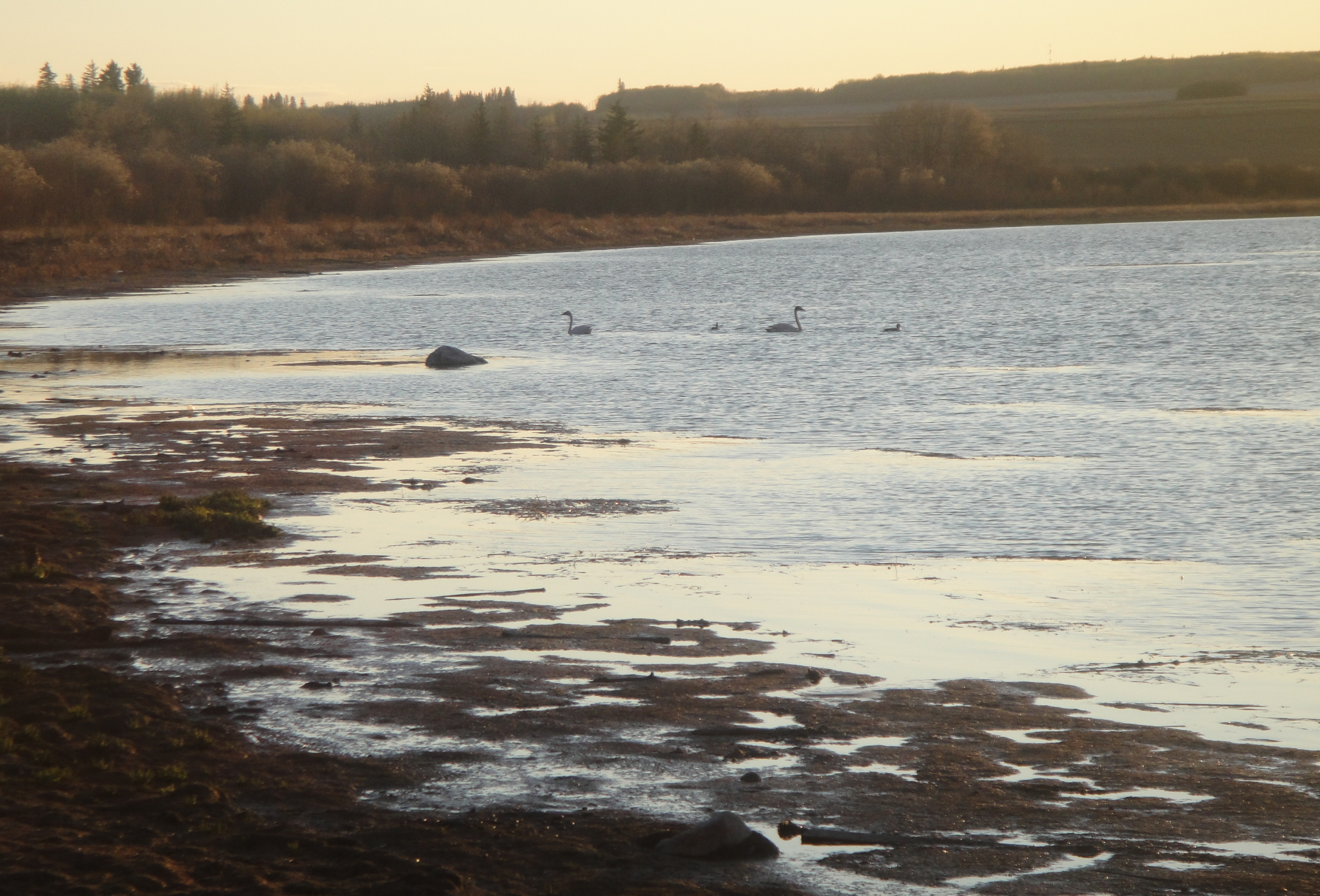
Trumpeter swans in Saskatoon Lake

The park is a federal migratory bird sanctuary as part of the Grande Prairie Important Bird Area, hosting (together with the nearby Bear Lake) the threatened trumpeter swan.

The lake and surrounding shrubland and aspen parkland are home to a variety of bird species such as tundra swans, Canada geese and northern harriers. Mammals are also present in the park and surrounding areas; species observed include moose, snowshoe hares, weasels, groundhogs, muskrats, beavers, deer and coyotes.

The Saskatoon Lake can no longer sustain a population of sport fish as it once did due to eutrophication, but is home to brook stickleback.

== Recreation ==
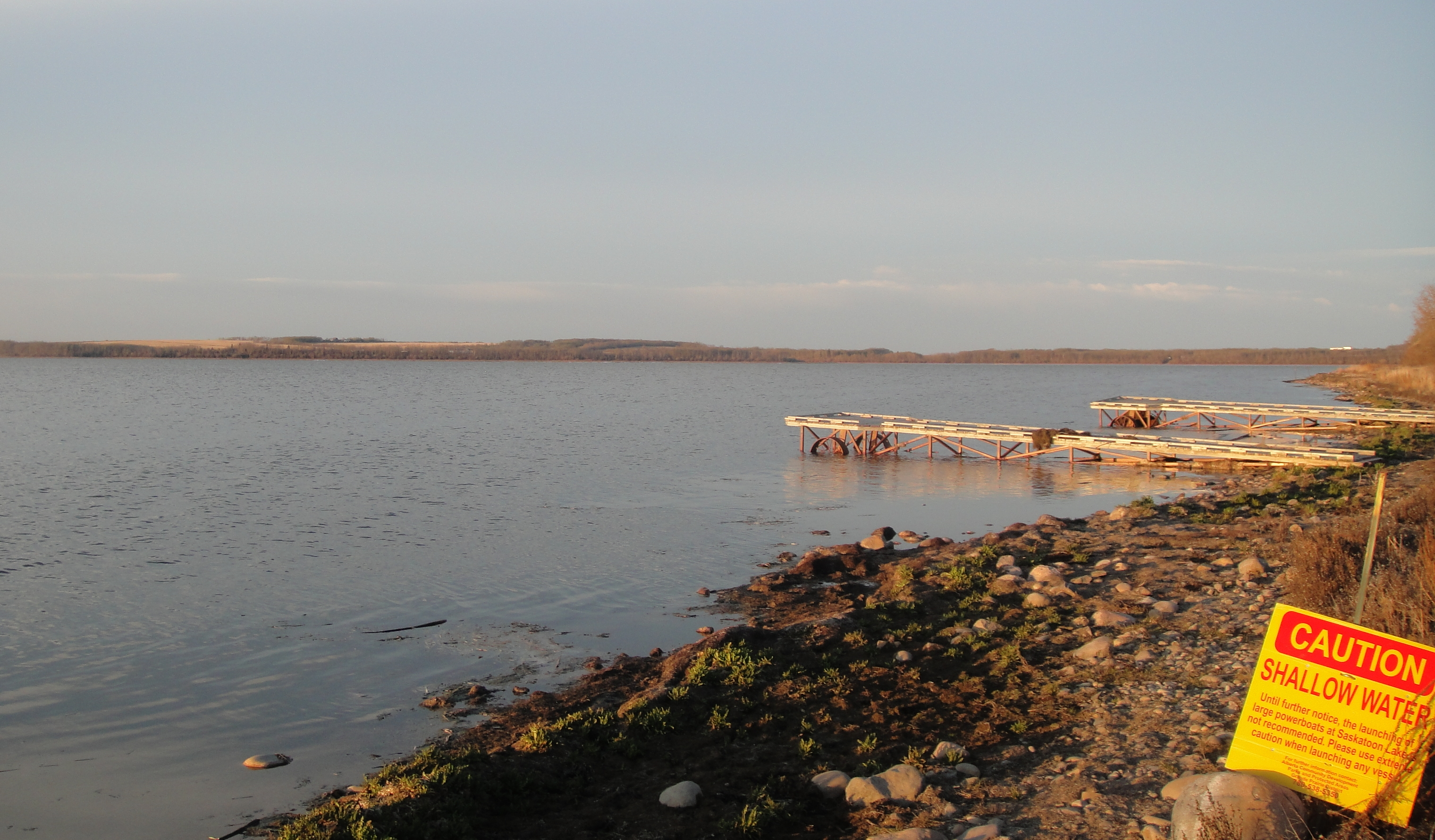
Boat docks on Saskatoon Lake

The park offers year-round camping, berry picking and wildlife viewing. Although boating and swimming on the lake was once popular, those activities are presently not recommended due to low water levels. Camping is offered year round, with 103 unit campground and 55 electrical hook-ups, including three paved and powered camp sites with washrooms and showers. A day use area with fire pits, picnic tables and basic facilities is maintained on the lake shore.

A hand-launch boat dock is maintained on the northern side of the park. Saskatoon berries are ripe in early summer.

Cross-country skiing is practiced in the park, with 6.4 kilometers (4.0 mi) of trails groomed in the winter for skiing, and for cycling in summer. 4.2 kilometers (2.6 mi) of hiking trails are maintained on the former island, including 1.2 kilometers (0.75 mi) wheelchair-accessible trails.

A yearly swan festival in organized in the park each April by the Friends of Saskatoon Island Cooperating Association. It celebrates the spring migration of the trumpeter swan.

== See also ==
- List of protected areas of Alberta
- List of provincial parks in Alberta
