= Nicolet Bird Sanctuary =

Migratory bird sanctuary in Quebec, Canada

Designations

Ramsar Wetland
- Official name: Lac Saint Pierre
- Designated: 25 May 1998
- Reference no.: 949

The Nicolet Bird sanctuary is a protected area in Quebec and one of the 28 migratory bird sanctuary of that province. This refuge protects a migratory halt for duck and Canada goose and also a nesting area for waterfowl. It is located a few kilometers west of Nicolet on the south shore of Lake Saint Pierre.

== Geography ==
The bird sanctuary is located west of Nicolet, Quebec on the south shore of Lake Saint Pierre to the village of Baie-du-Febvre. It also includes some islands of the Delta of the Nicolet River. The site is considered to be a central area of the Lac Saint-Pierre Biosphere Reserve in Canada 2000, as Ramsar Site in 1998 and as the Important Birds Conservation Area (ZICO).

The site is located in the town of Nicolet and the municipality of Baie-du-Febvre, both located in Nicolet-Yamaska and the Centre-du-Québec region.

=== Relief ===
The site is low-lying and is flooded every Spring. The vegetation passes from the aquatic environment, to a marsh of fluviatile bulb, to a swamp, a forest and finally abandoned fields.

== History ==
National Defense acquired the site in the 1950s. The site was recognized as a resting place in 1969 and as a refuge in 1982.

== Natural heritage ==
=== Fauna ===
During the spring migration, there were nearly 500,000 snow goose (Chen caerulescens), or nearly all of the population of species atlantica. It is also an important site for the migration of Canada geese (Branta canadensis), where more than 100,000 individuals were observed in 1998. There are also a number of black duck (Anas rubripes) and of black scoter (Melanitta nigra). During the autumn, there are a significant number of pintail (Anas acuta), small scaup (Aythya affinis), scaup and golden-eye withered (Bucephala clangula).

Ducks nesting on the site include Aix sponsa, the nasal duck, Anas clypeata, the gill duck, Anas strepera, American Anas americana, Aythya collaris, teal (Anas crecca) and the blue-winged teal (Anas discors). It also serves as a breeding ground for red-necked ducks (Aythya americana), Oxyura jamaicensis and Wilson's phalarope (Steganopus tricolor).

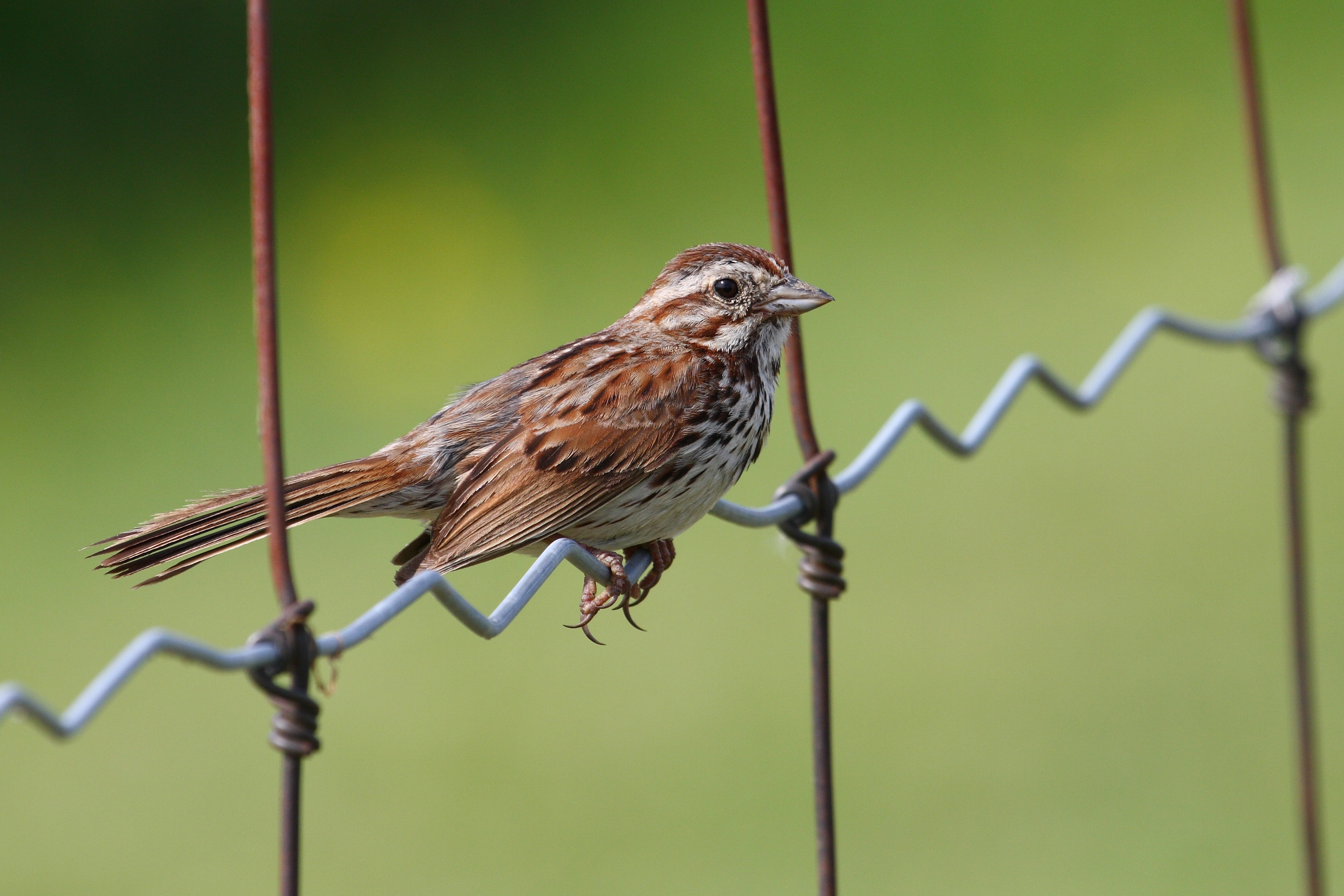
Song sparrow

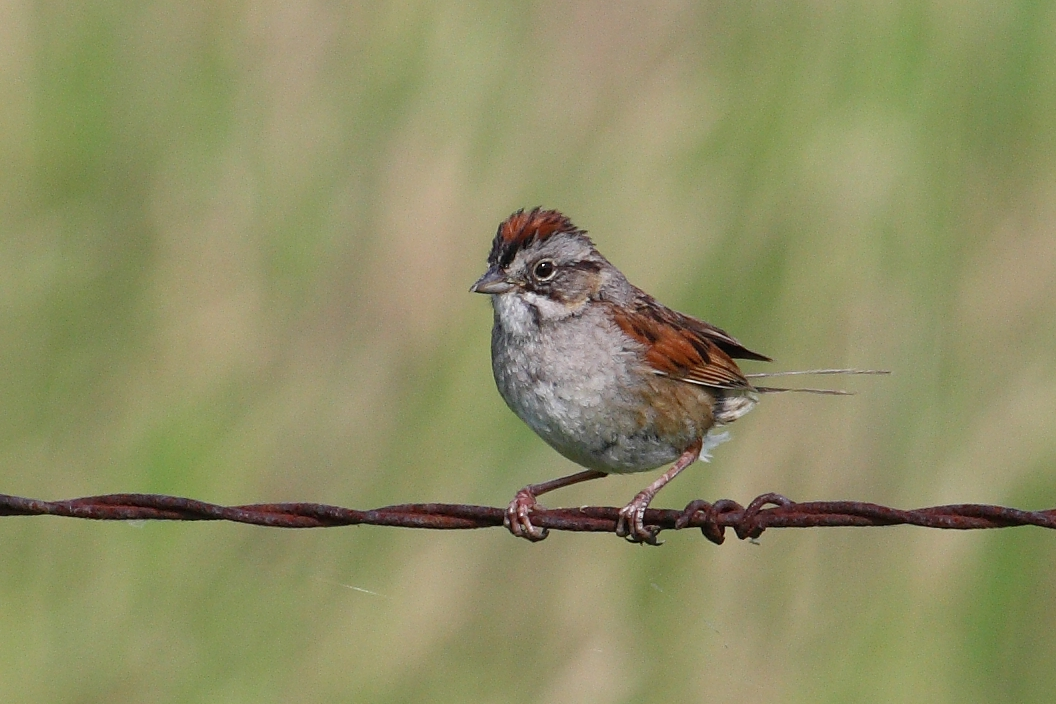
Swamp sparrow

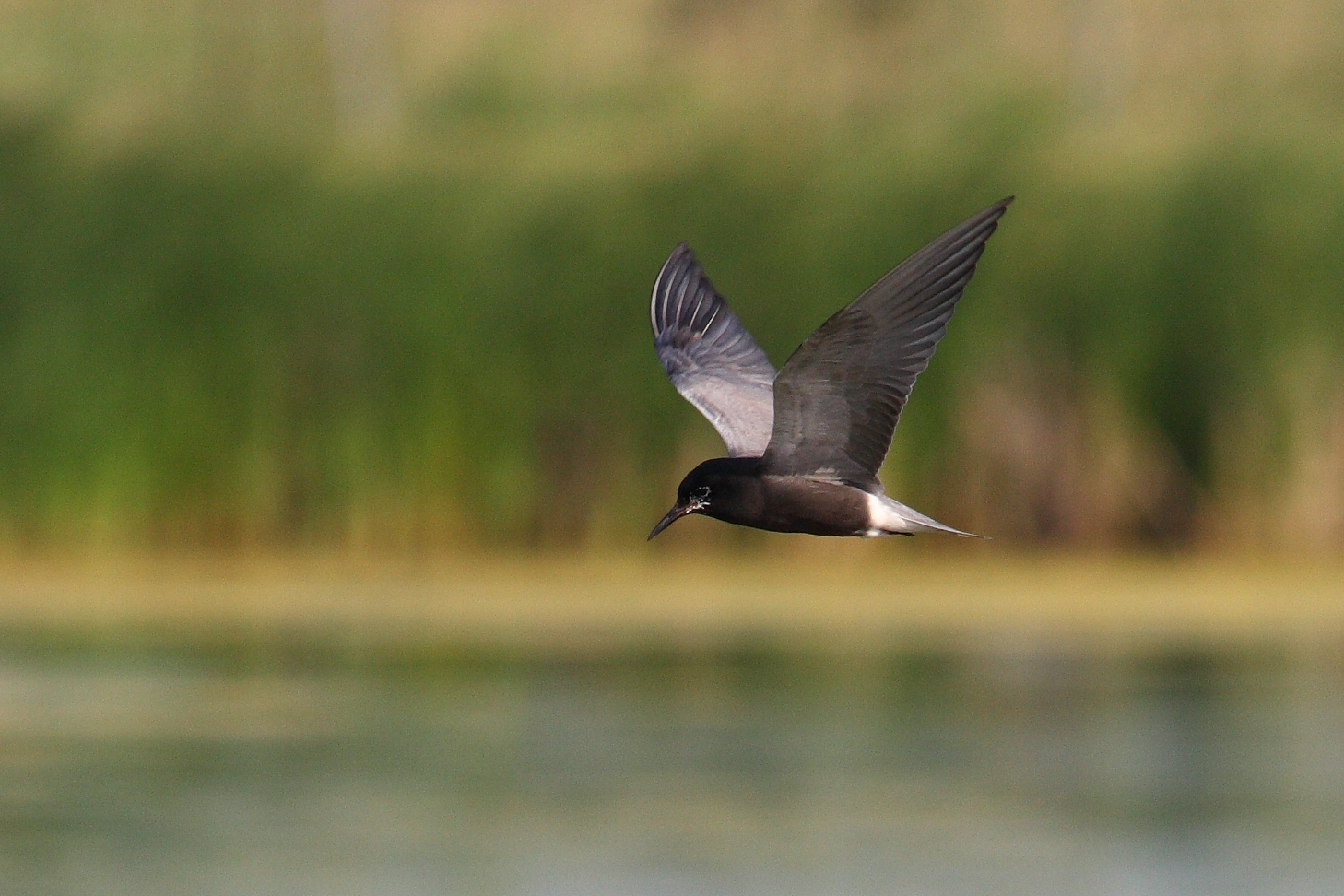
Black tern
