= Black Pond Migratory Bird Sanctuary =

Migratory bird sanctuary in Prince Edward Island, Canada

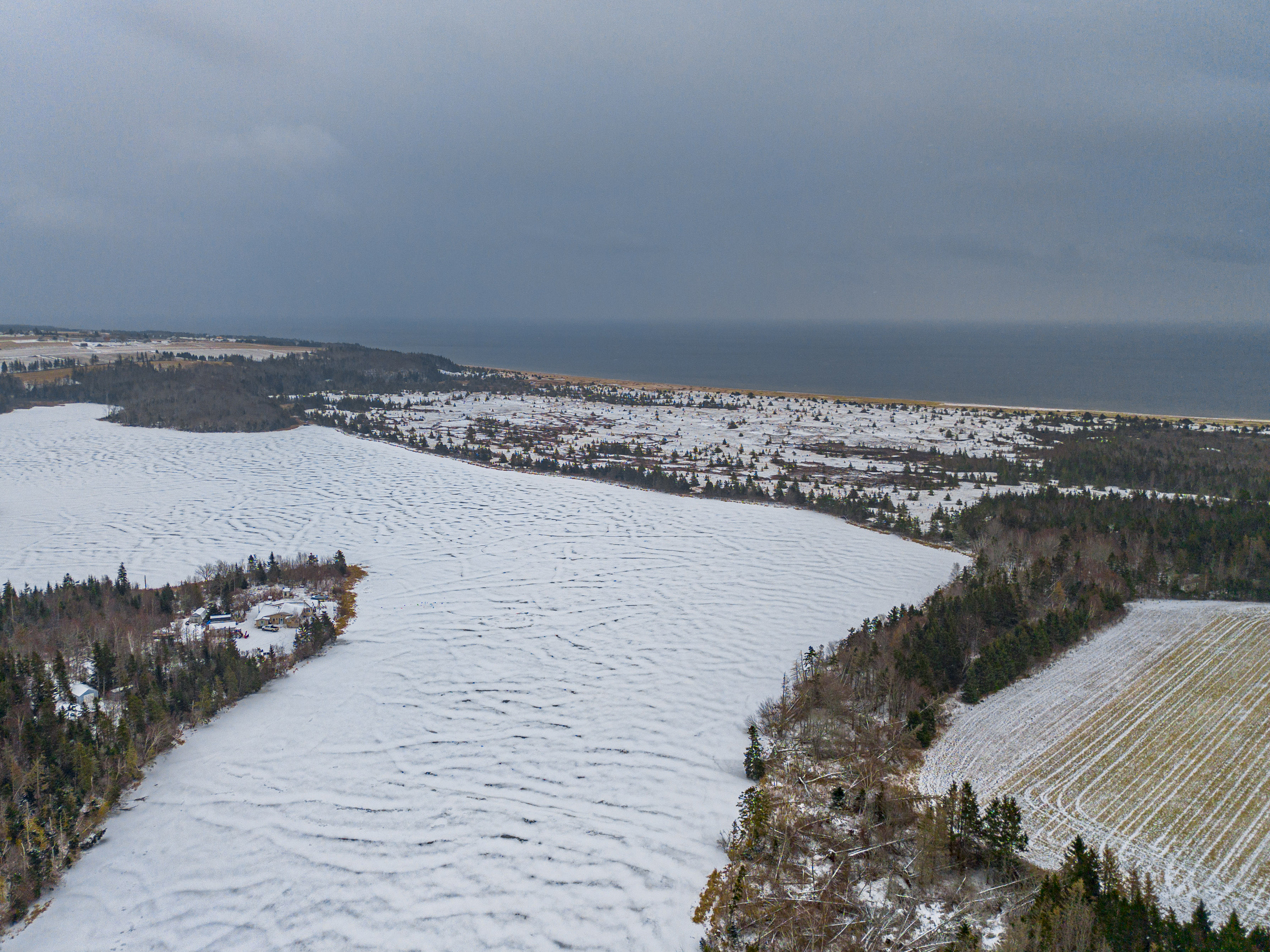
- Black Pond Migratory Bird Sanctuary in 2026
- Interactive map of Black Pond Migratory Bird Sanctuary
- Location: Prince Edward Island, Canada
- Nearest city: Souris
- Coordinates: 46°22′N 62°10′W
- Area: 130 ha (320 acres)
- Established: 1936
- Governing body: Canadian Wildlife Service, Atlantic Region

The Black Pond Migratory Bird Sanctuary is a migratory bird sanctuary located in eastern Prince Edward Island, Canada. The sanctuary lies along Highway 16, approximately 5 km (3.1 mi) east of the town of Souris. It is an important site for migratory birds and waterfowl production in eastern Prince Edward Island.

The sanctuary was established in 1936 and encompasses 130 ha (320 acres). It includes a shallow freshwater pond, associated wetlands, and adjacent coastal habitats used by migratory birds during breeding, staging, and migration periods.

== Ecology and habitat ==
Black Pond is a barrier-beach pond ecosystem. A sand barrier beach approximately 1 km (0.62 mi) wide separates the 50 ha (120 acres) freshwater pond from the Northumberland Strait. The barrier beach limits the influence of ocean waves and weather on the pond and contributes to relatively stable freshwater conditions.

The pond is shallow and supports beds of pondweed, with margins dominated by spike rush, cattail, and bulrush. Surrounding habitats include lowland agricultural fields, small white spruce woodlots, sand dunes, beaches, and marshland. Habitat within the sanctuary consists primarily of sand dunes (31%), spruce forest (29%), open water and marsh (20%), open fields (14%), beach (5%), and small residential areas (1%).

== Birdlife ==
Seasonal concentrations of waterfowl occur at the sanctuary during migration, with daily counts ranging from several hundred to over one thousand individuals. In spring, small flocks of Canada goose and brant are regularly observed. During autumn migration, particularly in September, large numbers of blue-winged teal use the site, along with smaller numbers of northern pintail and American wigeon. Many of these species depart by early October, while others remain later into the autumn. Flocks of American black duck may remain until Black Pond freezes in mid-December. During late fall and winter, an inlet that remains unfrozen supports smaller numbers of common goldeneye, bufflehead, and common merganser. Waterfowl known to nest within the sanctuary include American black duck, American green-winged teal, blue-winged teal, and ring-necked duck. A variety of shorebirds, seabirds, raptors, and passerines are also recorded at the site.

According to Avibase, at least 150 bird species have been recorded within Black Pond Migratory Bird Sanctuary, including seven globally threatened species and two introduced species. These records are based on compiled observations and long-term data from multiple sources.

== Species at risk ==
The piping plover (Charadrius melodus), a species listed under Canada's Species at Risk Act, has been recorded within the sanctuary.

== Access and management ==
Black Pond Migratory Bird Sanctuary is administered by the Canadian Wildlife Service. Land within the sanctuary is privately owned. Access is regulated to reduce disturbance to wildlife during sensitive periods such as nesting and migration. Activities including hunting, possession of firearms, and the disturbance of wildlife are restricted.
