= Nechako River Migratory Bird Sanctuary =

Migratory bird sanctuary in British Columbia, Canada

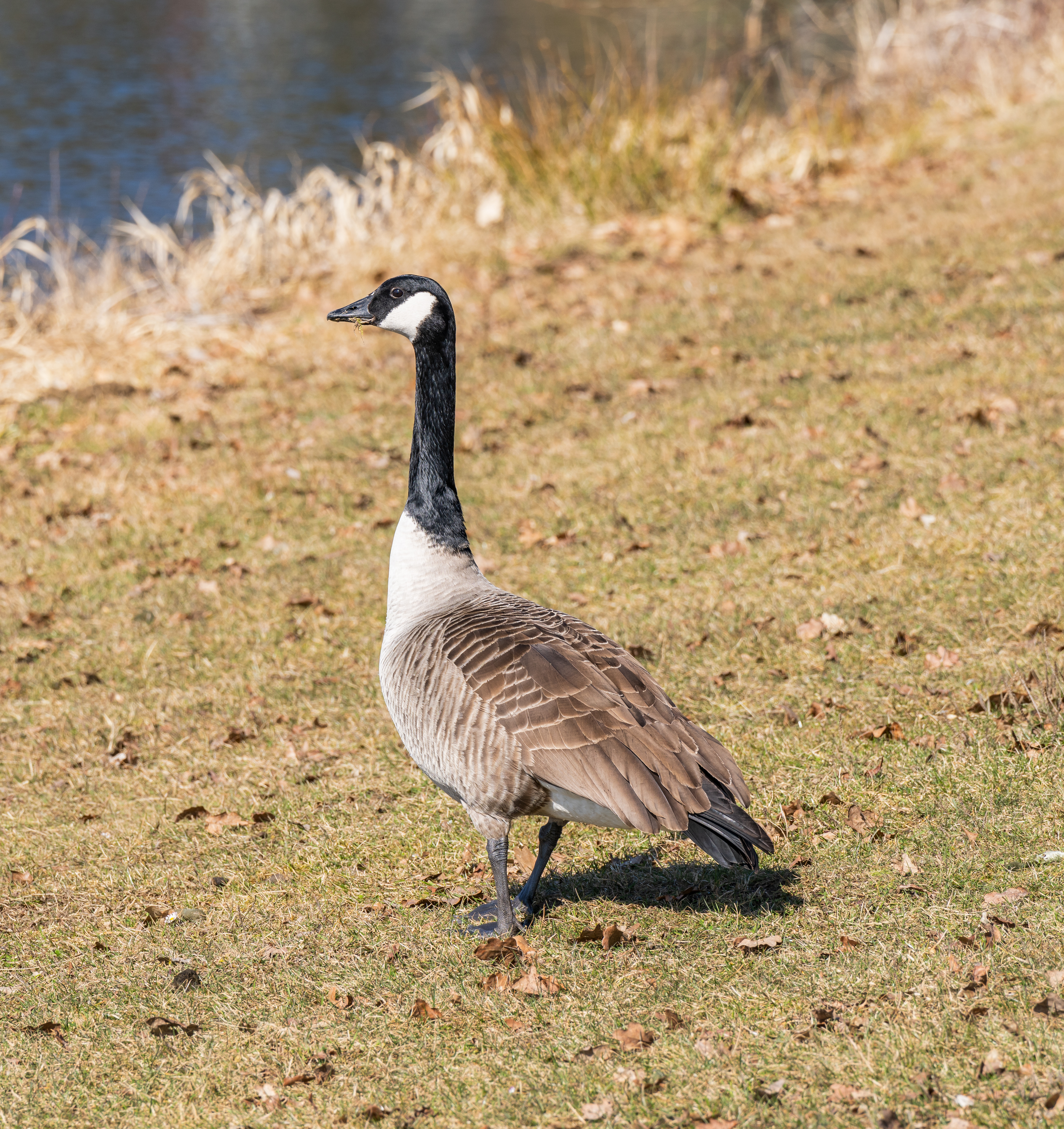
- A Canadian Goose at Nechako River Migratory Bird Sanctuary
- Interactive map of Nechako River Migratory Bird Sanctuary
- Location: British Columbia
- Nearest city: Vanderhoof
- Area: 1.8 km/2
- Established: 1944

The Nechako River Migratory Bird Sanctuary (French: Refuge D'oiseaux Migrateurs de la Riviére Nechako) is a protected area for migratory birds in British Columbia, Canada. Located to the North and West of the township of Vanderhoof, the Sanctuary lies along the Nechako River, encompassing land area on both the North and South banks of the river, as well as the numerous islands throughout.

Established in 1944, and spanning 180 hectares (1.8 km^{2}), the Nechako River Migratory Bird Sanctuary is managed by the Canadian Wildlife Service.

It is a major stopping ground for Canadian Geese, Trumpeter Swans, Northern Pintails, Caspian Terns, White Pelicans and other migratory birds.
