= Esquimalt Lagoon Migratory Bird Sanctuary =

Migratory Bird Sanctuary in British Columbia, Canada

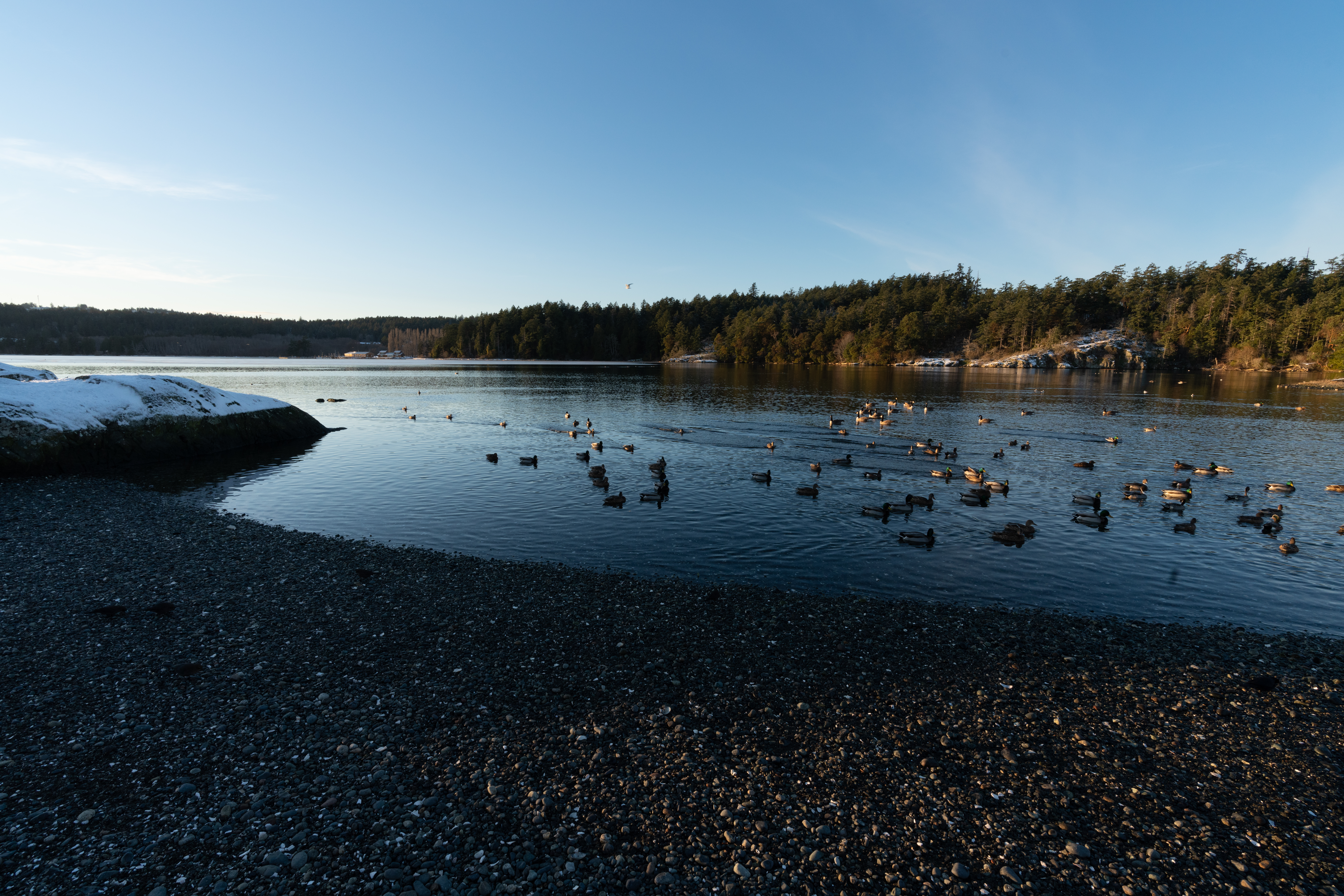
- Birds resting on the water in Esquimalt Lagoon

- Location within Vancouver Island Location within British Columbia
- Location: Salish Sea, British Columbia, Canada
- Nearest city: Victoria, British Columbia, Canada
- Coordinates: 48°25′34″N 123°27′58″W
- Area: 134 ha (330 acres)
- Designation: Migratory Bird Sanctuary
- Established: 1931
- Governing body: Canadian Wildlife Service

Esquimalt Lagoon Migratory Bird Sanctuary is a migratory bird sanctuary near Esquimalt Harbour in Colwood, British Columbia. The Esquimalt Lagoon is found on the traditional territories of the Esquimalt and Songhees Nations. The park was established in 1931 with the objective of creating a safe haven for migratory birds, and has become a popular place for birdwatching. Many other species can be found within the park, such as coho salmon and cutthroat trout. Pacific herring also spawn in nearby waters.

== History ==
Archaeological findings suggest that the native Esquimalt and Songhees peoples have a longstanding connection to the Esquimalt Lagoon and Coburg Peninsula. For thousands of years, these Indigenous communities occupied and utilized the lagoon for subsistence, and spiritual purposes. The area provided abundant resources such as fish, birds, mammals, berries, roots, tubers, and clam beds at the lagoon's entrance for harvest.

European influence in the area began in 1854 with the establishment of a British naval base and firing range. The Gold Rush of 1858 brought a influx of settlers to the region, leading to the establishment of farms and industries.

In 1931 the Esquimalt Lagoon Migratory Bird Sanctuary was established with the purpose of protecting migratory species of birds that travel through the pacific by providing a safe space for them to roost. Currently, the lagoon is used by residents and tourists alike for outdoor activities such as kayaking and scuba diving, as well as watching its unique wildlife.

=== Indigenous background ===
The lagoon lies on the territory of the Esquimalt and the Songhees Nation, and nearby resides the Beecher Bay Nation. These nations gathered plant resources, including essential materials, root tubers, and berries from the shoreline and harbour. They also used the land the hunt, fish, and collect shellfish. It is reported that the nations split their time between the Esquimalt lagoon and the Gulf and San Juan Islands based on the seasons.

In 1849 Aboriginal Title was recognized and Esquimalt Nation was one of fourteen nations to sign the Douglas treaty over 150 years ago. Though they retain Aboriginal Title under the Douglas treaty and the right to hunt on unoccupied land, Esquimalt Nation has identified one of its current challenges as understanding what these rights mean for them if resources are no longer available due to urban development; including forest and fisheries management.

== Objectives ==
Established on December 12, 1931, The Esquimalt Lagoon Migratory bird Sanctuary was created in Colwood, British Columbia, with the objective of providing a safe haven for migratory birds on the Pacific coast. Due to its shallow tidal waters, the abundant shelter and resources found within, and due to having two gravel-bar islands and a rocky outcrop for loafing, the Esquimalt Lagoon sanctuary has become one of the most important Birding spots in the region.

== Climate change ==
Climate change will affect the Esquimalt Lagoon through rising sea-levels and temperatures, which causes a loss of habitat. The intertidal marsh is considered to be acting resilient against climate change. The salt marsh acts as a carbon sequestration system and also adds protection against flooding. However the rising-sea levels will continue to cause a loss of low-lying lands, coastal erosion, saltwater intrusion and soil salination. Rising temperatures are also altering key ecosystem functions like phenology, reproduction, nutrient cycling, and other vital functions necessary for a resilient ecosystem.

== Habitat management ==
The nearby First Nation communities of the Esquimalt Nation, Songhees Nation, and Beecher Bay Nation are working directly with the City of Colwood to protect the waterfront from climate change and sea level rise at the Esquimalt lagoon. Their future plan will include the management of shoreline sediment processes, infrastructure and service provisions, and the enhancement and protection of the ecological elements. To further protect the wildlife, the Esquimalt was established as a sanctuary in 1931 by Environment and Climate Change Canada (ECCC).

== Plants and wildlife ==
The Esquimalt Lagoon is used by various bird species year round, including many gulls, ducks and shorebirds. There are seasonal differences in the number of birds visiting the lagoon, and numbers typically peak in the late summer and fall during migration. Common species of birds that can be found within the park are Canada geese (Branta cabadebsis), mallards (Anas okatyrhynchos), American wigeons (Mareca americana), northern pintails (A. acuta), greater and lesser scaups (Aythya marila/affinis), and hooded mergansers (Lophodytes cucullatus). There have been a total of 229 different bird species reported at the site. The mudflats, eelgrass and estuary marsh habitats surrounding and within the lagoon provide foraging opportunities and nesting areas for both migratory and resident birds.

Many aquatic species, including Coho salmon and Cutthroat trout, enter the lagoon through streams that flow into the lagoon. Other species, including river otters (Lontra canadensis) can also be found at the Esquimalt Lagoon. Bivalves, sand dollars, sea lettuce and eelgrass are also commonly found within the lagoon.

=== Species at risk ===
The great blue heron, which can be seen on site at the Esquimalt Lagoon, is considered to be a species of concern, and is listed under the Species at Risk Act (SARA). The number of herons found here typically peaks in the spring and summer.
