= Migratory Birds Convention Act =

Canadian law

The Migratory Birds Convention Act (also MBCA) is a Canadian law established in 1917 and significantly updated in June 1994 which contains regulations to protect migratory birds, their eggs, and their nests from destruction by hunting, trafficking and commercialization. A permit is required to engage in any of these activities.

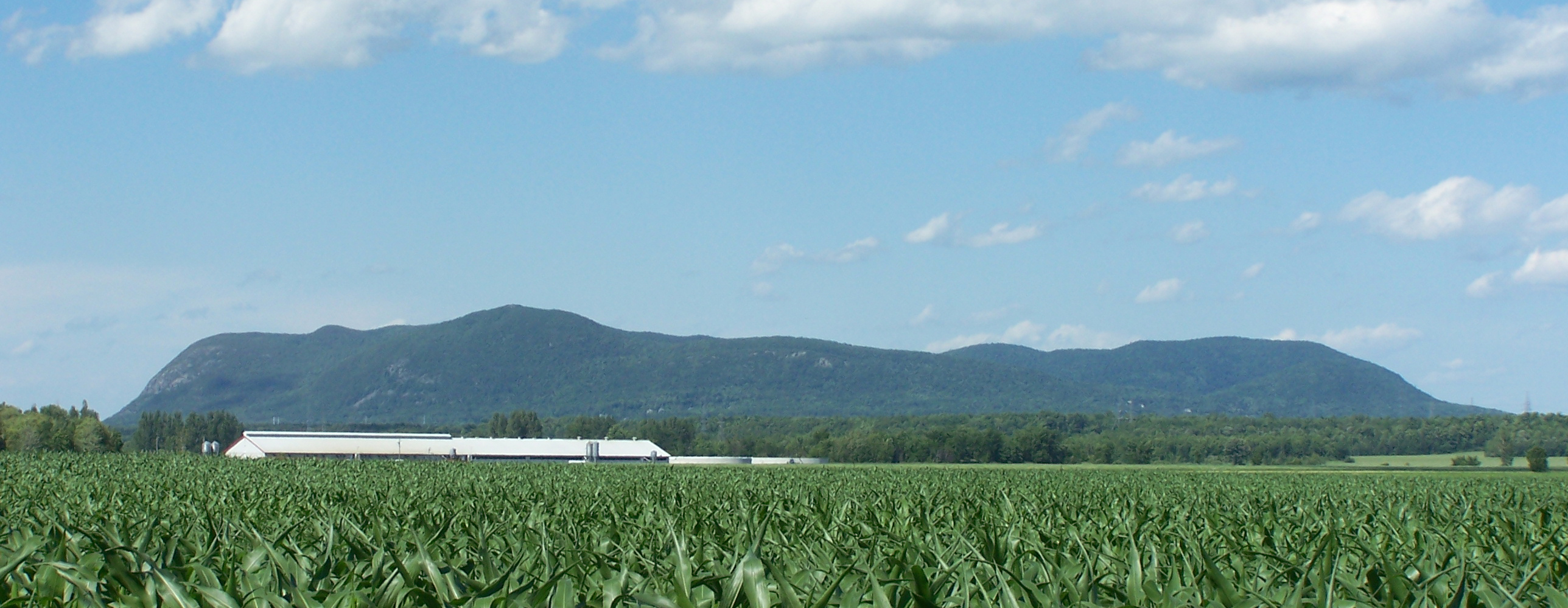
Mont Saint-Hilaire in southern Quebec was made a Migratory Bird Sanctuary in 1960.

== History ==
In 1909, the federal government established the Advisory Board on Wildlife Protection, which notably included C.G. Hewitt and James Harkin as prominent members. This board would go on to sign the Migratory Bird Convention with the United States because of concern both countries had regarding the uncontrolled hunting of waterfowl and shorebirds. The original MBCA law was passed to satisfy the terms of this agreement with the United States. The updated version includes stronger enforcement and greater penalties. A geographical area may be designated as a Migratory Bird Refuge under this convention; this restricts activities targeting a specified set of birds in that area, but does not protect the land or water features. To establish complete habitat protection, the more stringent requirements of the Canada Wildlife Act are necessary.

== See also ==
- List of Migratory Bird Sanctuaries of Canada
- Migratory Bird Treaty Act of 1918, the American law implementing the treaty
