= Alexander Morton (manufacturer) =

Scottish textiles manufacturer (1844–1923)

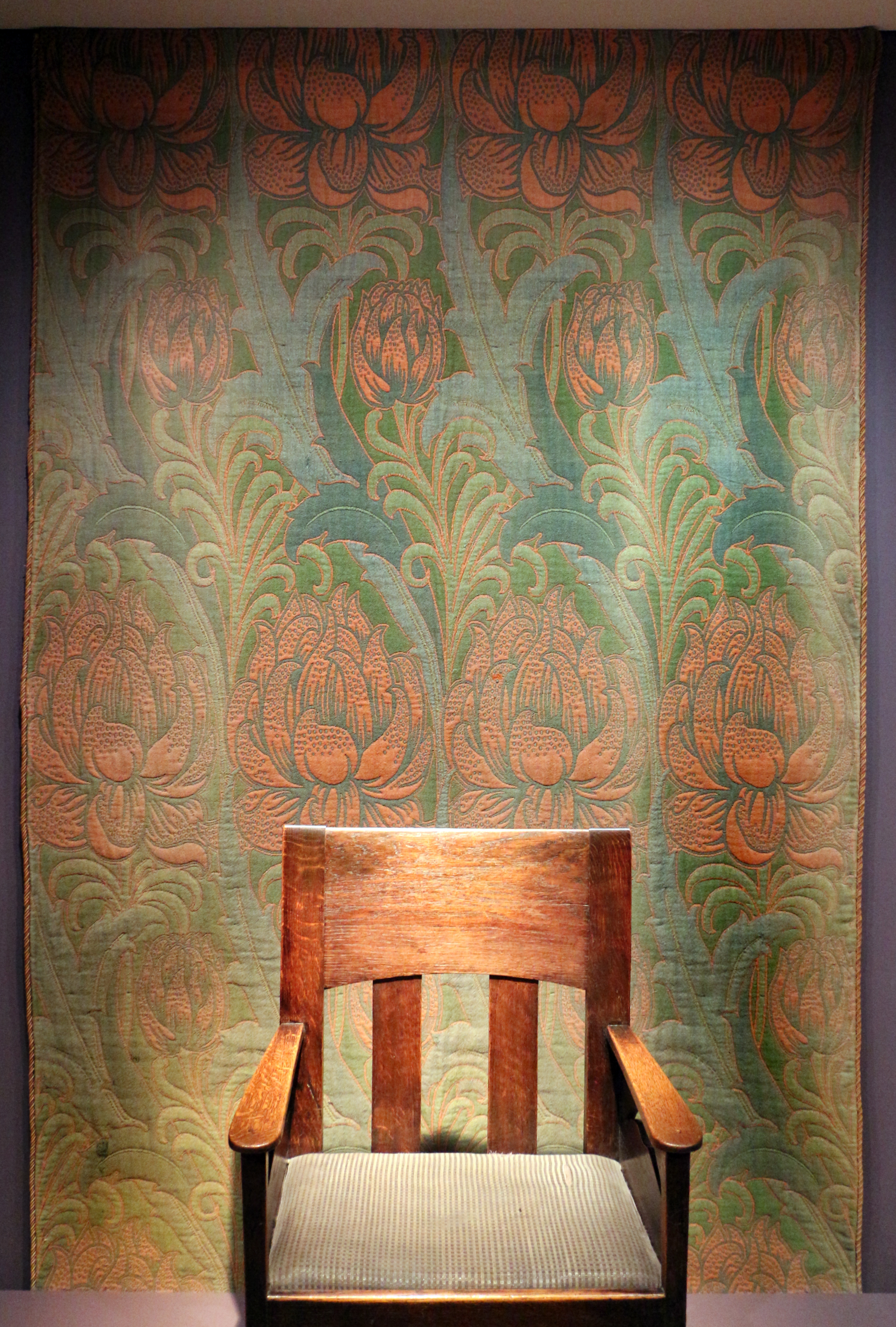
Fabric designed by C. F. A. Voysey for Liberty of London and manufactured by Alexander Morton and Co - on display in the Musée d'Orsay, Paris

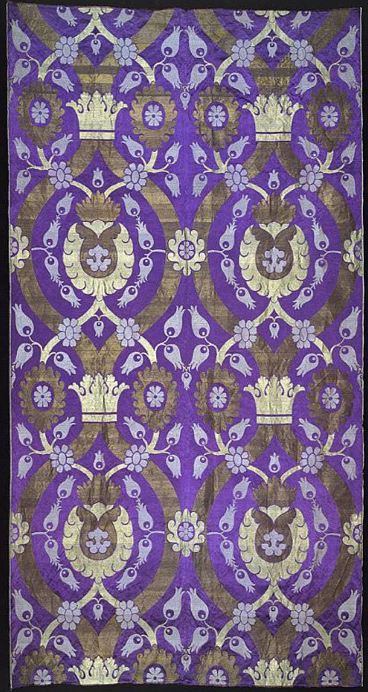
1887 silk panel, designed by Alexander Morton

Alexander Morton (9 February 1844–1923) was a Scottish textiles manufacturer.

In 1875, he founded Alexander Morton and Company in Darvel, Ayrshire. In the 1890s, they had nearly 600 employees. By 1900, they had expanded to Carlisle, England and Killybegs, Ireland (Donegal Carpets). The Donegal carpet industry owes its origins to Alexander Morton.

They used the services of many designers, especially C. F. A. Voysey, Heywood Sumner and Lindsay Butterfield, and later Cecil Millar and George Henry Walton.

In 1914, he reorganised his business interests, with a new company Morton Sundour being "the major off-shoot". It was run by his second son James Morton.

A monument to Alexander Morton in Loudoun, Ayrshire, erected in 1927, is a Category A listed building.

The Victoria and Albert Museum, London holds 774 examples of their fabrics in their collection.
