= St David's Hotel =

St David's Hotel may refer to:

- St David's Hotel, Harlech
- Voco St David's Cardiff Hotel
