= F Gregory Brown =

English artist and designer (4 January 1887– 5 March 1941)

Frederic Gregory Brown
- Brown in 1927
- Born: 4 January 1887; Islington
- Died: 5 March 1941 (aged 54); Finsbury
- Known for: Textile design; Advertising posters; Metal work
- Notable work: Visit Of King And Queen To Bournville

Frederic Gregory Brown RBA (4 January 1887- 5 March 1941) was an English artist and designer. A founding member of the Design and Industries Association, he is best known for his advertising posters for the London Underground. He signed his works F Gregory Brown or Gregory Brown. His use of flat colour in his posters made him a big influencer on artists of his generation.

== History ==
Brown was born in Islington on 4 January 1887. His father was the art master John Terrell Brown, and he initially completed an apprenticeship in metal work when he left school. After completing his apprenticeship he started out by making art metalwork, and in 1915 he was a founding member of the Design and Industries Association.

In 1914, Gregory started to design posters for London Underground, which he continued to do until 1940 producing over 70 designs. In 1915, he produced the front cover illustration for: IN HOC VINCE The story of A Red Cross Flag, by Florence L. Barclay. Brown started working for furniture fabric manufacturer William Foxton Ltd during the 1920s, creating many designs. In 1922, he was commissioned to produce an artwork for Queen Mary's Dolls' House. Brown further expanded his clientele by working with businesses such as the Empire marketing board, National Railway Companies, ICI, Witney Blankets and department stores Bobby & Co. and Derry & Toms. His works were regularly reviewed favourably in publications Commercial Art and Gebrauchsgraphik during the 1920s and 30s, while in 1927 the Yorkshire Evening Post was advising it's readers to decorate their newly-built suburban homes with the latest Gregory Brown designs cheaply acquired from the railway companies and cut down for framing.

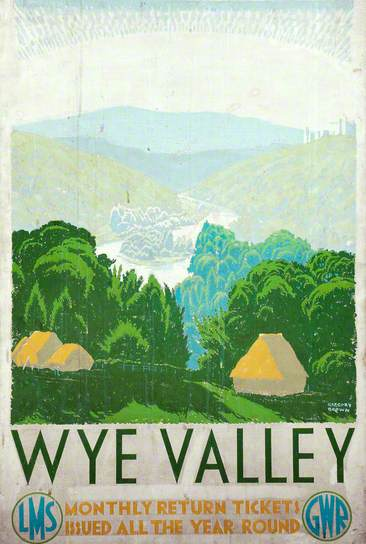
Poster of the Wye Valley

In 1928, Brown stated to the magazine, Commercial Art that "To make a good job of a poster it must be well designed, but for goodness sake do not drag it into the mud by calling it ‘Art’". Brown was heavily critical of advertising managers, using his membership of the Design in Industry Association and the Royal Society of British Artists to blast ill-informed and unimaginative commissioning. In an article in 1933, Brown wrote "the hoardings of this country are, in spite of a few notable exceptions, an insult to the public intelligence and a disgrace to Poster Art". His opinions gained him the reputation that he was a prima-donna.

Brown died in Finsbury on 5 March 1941.

== Awards and recognition ==
Brown was elected as a member of the Royal Society of British Artists in 1913. In 1923, Brown won a diploma at the Milan International Exhibition, while in 1925, he won Gold Medal at the Paris Exhibition of Decorative Arts for his textile design created for William Foxton.

The National Portrait Gallery has a number of photographic portraits of Brown, all taken by Howard Coster in 1927.

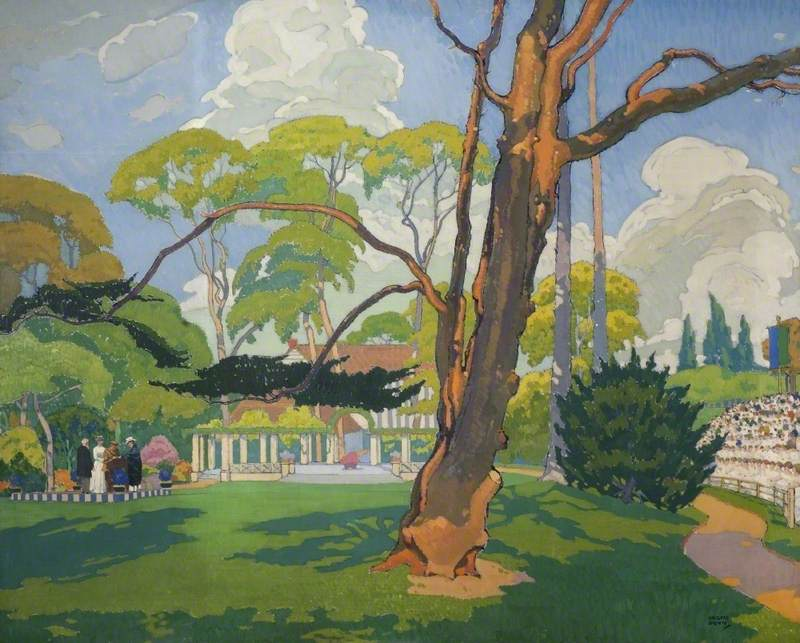
Visit of King and Queen to Bournville, 16th May 1919, now in the collection of Birmingham Museum and Art Gallery, to which it was donated in 1980

His artwork and fabric designs are held in the United Kingdom within the collections of the London Transport Museum, the Victoria and Albert Museum the British Council, the National Rail Museum, Birmingham Museum and Art Gallery and the British Museum. Externally to the United Kingdom, Browns work are included in the collections at the Art Institute of Chicago.
