= William Foxton Ltd =

British textile manufacturer

William Foxton Ltd was a British textile manufacturer.

The company was founded in 1903 by William Foxton, and produced "some of the most innovative artist-designed textiles of the times".

They commissioned work from (inter alia) Charles Rennie Mackintosh, Claud Lovat Fraser, F. Gregory Brown, Minnie McLeish, and Constance Irving. In 1915, Foxton helped found the Design and Industries Association.

They produced fabrics until at least 1939. In 1945, Foxton wrote that all of their papers and samples were destroyed in an air raid in 1942.

Hundreds of their designs are in the permanent collection of the Victoria and Albert Museum.
