= 21 and 25 Stonegate =

Listed building in York, England

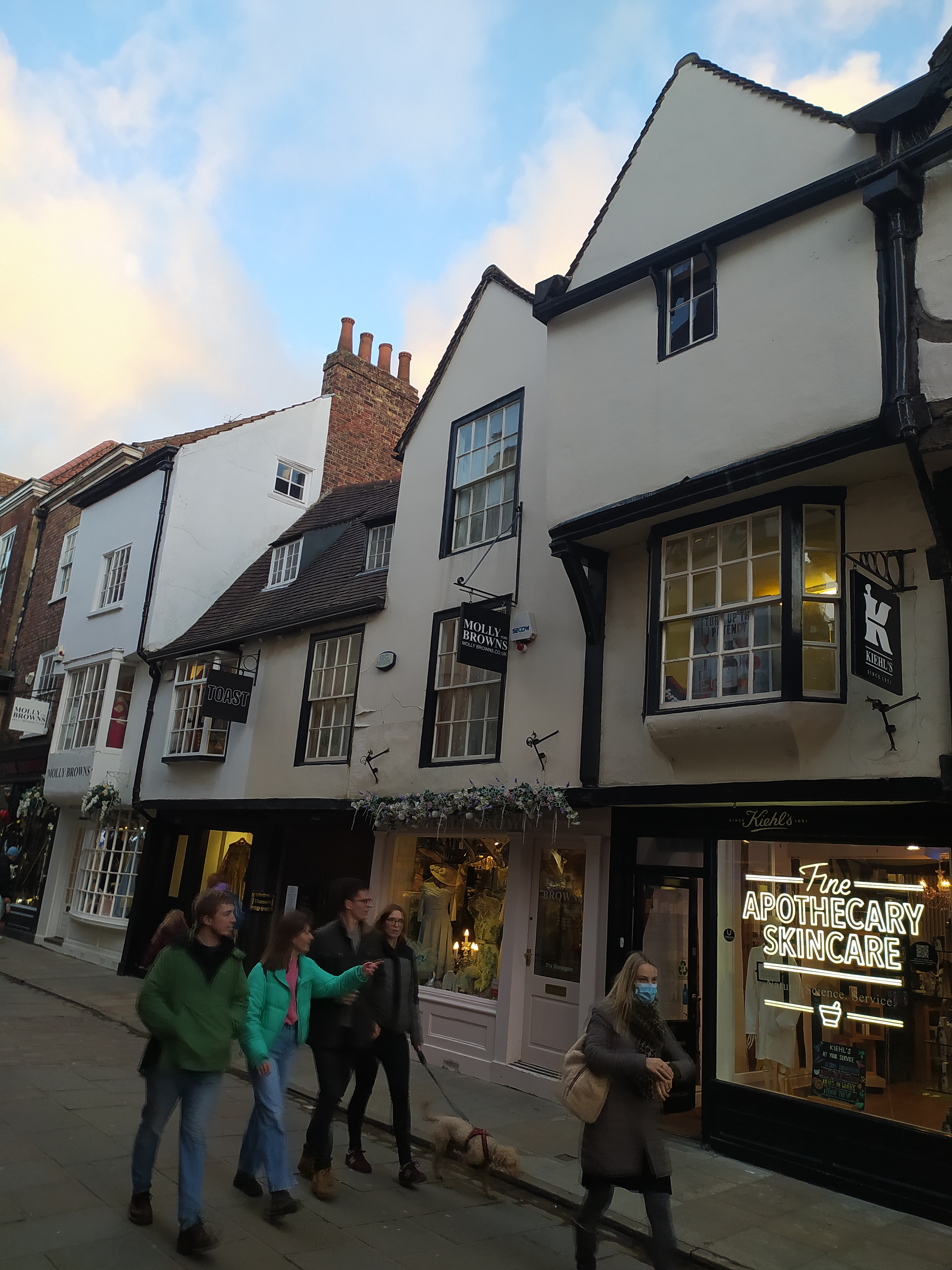
- The building in 2022
- Interactive map of the 21 and 25 Stonegate area

General information
- Location: Stonegate, York, England
- Coordinates: 53°57′39″N 1°04′59″W
- Year built: 15th century
- Renovated: Late 16th century (part raised); 18th century (part raised) c. 1700 (part extended); 19th century (shopfront); Late 19th century (extended); 1974 (restored)

Technical details
- Floor count: 3

Design and construction
- Designations

Listed Building – Grade II*
- Official name: 21 and 25, Stonegate
- Designated: 14 June 1954
- Reference no.: 1256514

21 and 25 Stonegate is a historic building in the city centre of York, in England.

The building's origins are in the 15th century, when a terrace of three timber-framed houses was constructed. This was probably originally five bays long, but the north-easternmost bay was later demolished. The houses were originally all two storeys tall, with the upper floors jettied. In the late 16th century, an extra storey was added to the south-westernmost bay. The north-easternmost bay had a rear wing added in brick in about 1700, and in the 18th century, the second bay from the south-west also had a third storey added. In the late 19th century, brick extensions were added at the back of the remaining bays.

From 1898 to 1902, the architect George Henry Walton worked from No. 21. The building was Grade II* listed in 1954, and was restored in 1974.

The front of the building is plastered, and the ground floor is occupied by shopfronts, some of which date from the 19th century. There are sash windows on the upper floors. The ground floor of one bay is now taken up with a wide passageway giving access to the York Medical Society building at 23 Stonegate. Inside, there is a historic staircase, and some cast iron fireplaces.

== See also ==
- Grade II* listed buildings in the City of York
- Listed buildings in York (within the city walls, northern part)
