= Charles Paine (artist) =

British artist and illustrator

- Born: 23 October 1895; Pendleton, Lancashire, England
- Died: 7 June 1967 (aged 71); Jersey
- Education: Royal College of Art
- Occupations: Artist; illustrator; designer

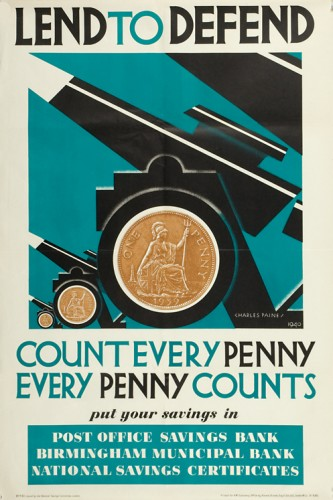
Lend to Defend, 1940 poster designed by Paine

Charles Paine (23 October 1895 – 7 June 1967) was a British artist, illustrator and designer. He designed 31 London Underground posters in the 1920s.

Charles Paine was born on 23 October 1895 in Pendleton, Lancashire, England. He studied at Salford College of Art and graduated from the Royal College of Art in 1919. He then worked for Edinburgh College of Art's Applied Art Department, where his immediate superior was the printmaker John Platt (1886–1967).

It is believed that Platt introduced Paine to Frank Pick, for whom he designed 31 London Underground posters. He worked extensively with the Baynard Press, for which he produced posters and other graphic designs for a wide range of companies. He designed London Underground posters for The Boat Race in 1921 and 1923.

As well as London Underground, Paine designed for the Empire Marketing Board, the GPO, Penguin Books, Sundour Fabrics, and produced government propaganda materials during the Second World War.

In 1939, Paine was employed by the new town of Welwyn Garden City to "take responsibility for the creative angle of the organisation's publicity". In 1948, he moved to Jersey where he lived until his death.

Paine died at his Jersey home on 7 June 1967.

== Legacy ==
Paine's work is in the permanent collection of the Art Institute of Chicago and the Victoria and Albert Museum. His 1921 London Underground poster, For the Zoo, appears on a 2013 Royal Mail postage stamp.
