= Donegal Carpets =

Brand of handmade wool carpets

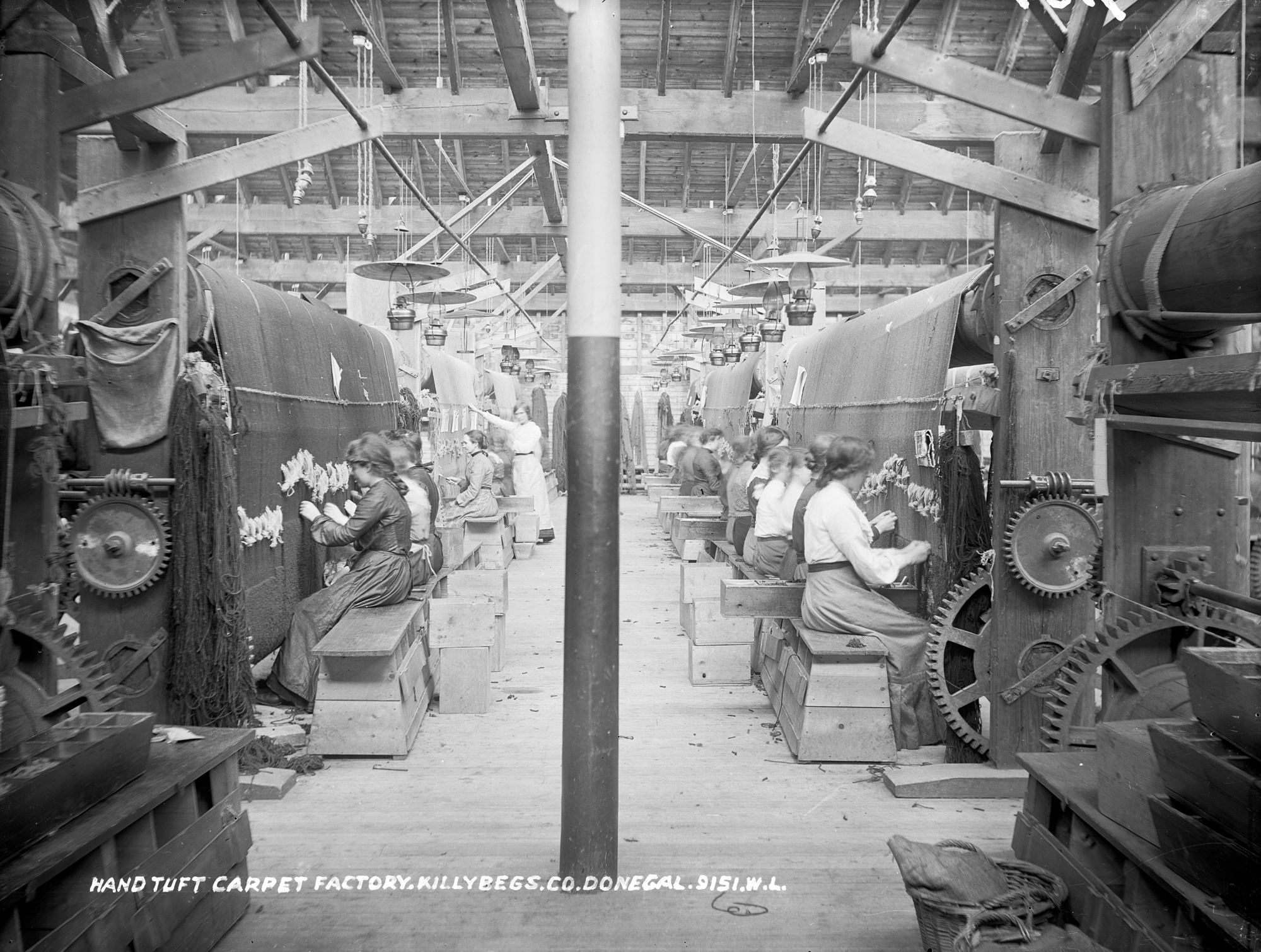
Women hand tufting carpets in a factory in Killybegs, circa 1905

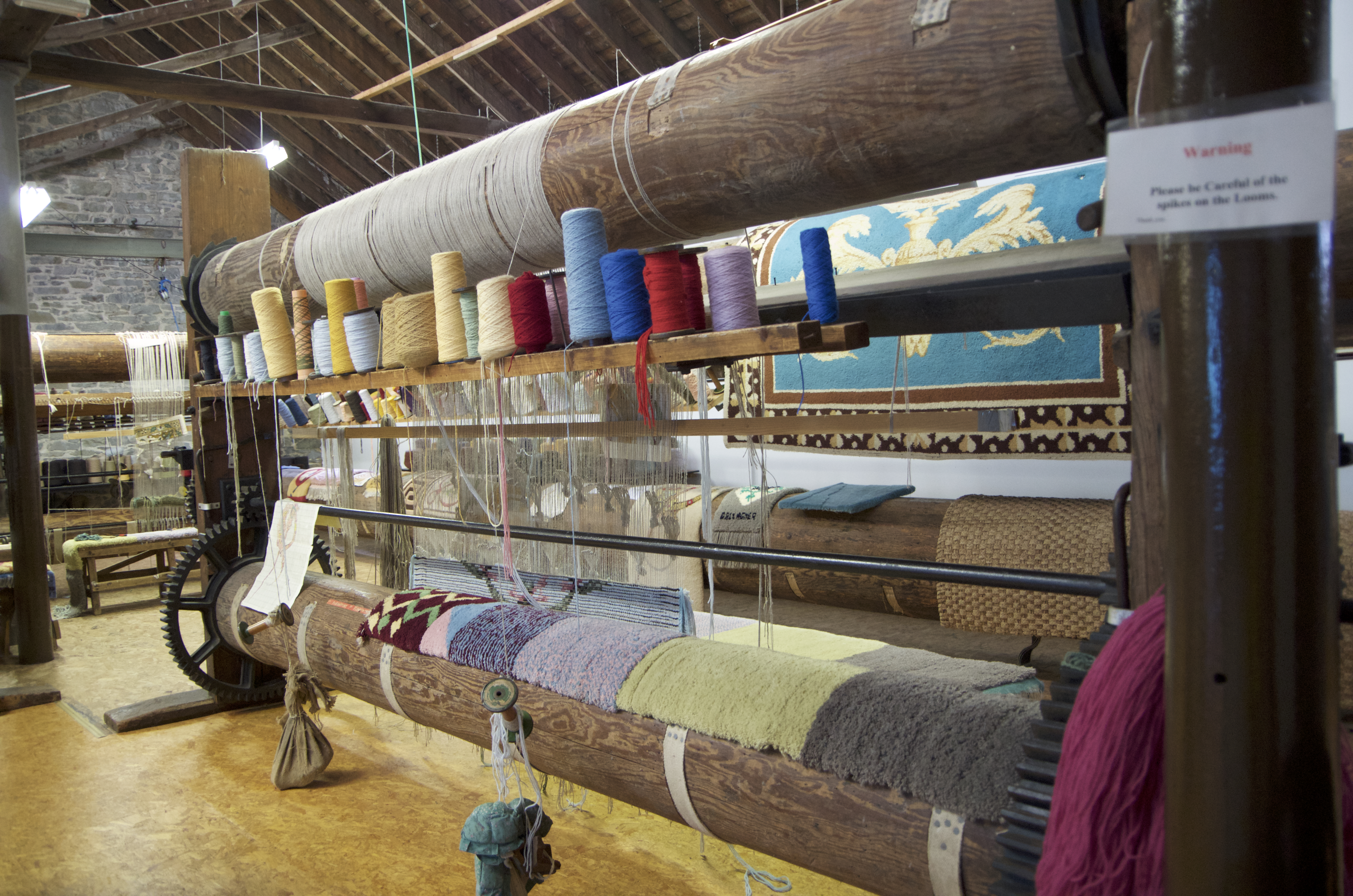
The last carpet factory is really a museum used only by volunteers

Donegal Carpets is a trademark brand of handmade wool carpets produced in Killybegs, a town in County Donegal, Ireland. Donegal Carpets can be found in Dublin Castle, the Royal Pavilion of Brighton, Eltham Palace, and the U.S. White House as well as many other parts of the world.

== History ==
Although making carpets in Donegal is an ancient tradition, the company Donegal Carpets was founded in 1898 by Scottish textile manufacturer Alexander Morton. Before establishing Donegal Carpets, Morton had first established a carpet crafting house on the west coast of Ireland and put to practice the techniques of the Donegal people who had been working with wool for generations. In 1891 the Congested Districts Board for Ireland was set up to alleviate poverty and congested living conditions in the west of Ireland and hired Morton to develop its carpet industry.

The first example of a Donegal carpet with Celtic designs was that carried out for the Department of Agriculture and Technical Instruction for Ireland for their offices at the Cork Exhibition in 1902. There is another earlier example, a small Celtic-ornamented altar carpet, Morton's gift to the Cathedral of St Eunan and St Columba, Letterkenny, County Donegal, which was opened in June 1901. The altar carpet was designed by Signor Oreste Amici, a Roman painter, who carried out the Celtic ornamental painting in the St Columba Chapel in 1900.

The Mortons sold the company to a consortium called Donegal Carpets Ltd. in 1957. There were four manufacturing houses at one time in County Donegal but three of the four facilities closed during the Great Depression and in 1987 the last facility closed. Local people petitioned the government to help re-open them in 1997 and in 1999 they were making carpets again for places such as Áras an Uachtaráin, Dublin Castle, and the University of Notre Dame.
