= Willow Tearooms =

Tearooms in Glasgow, Scotland

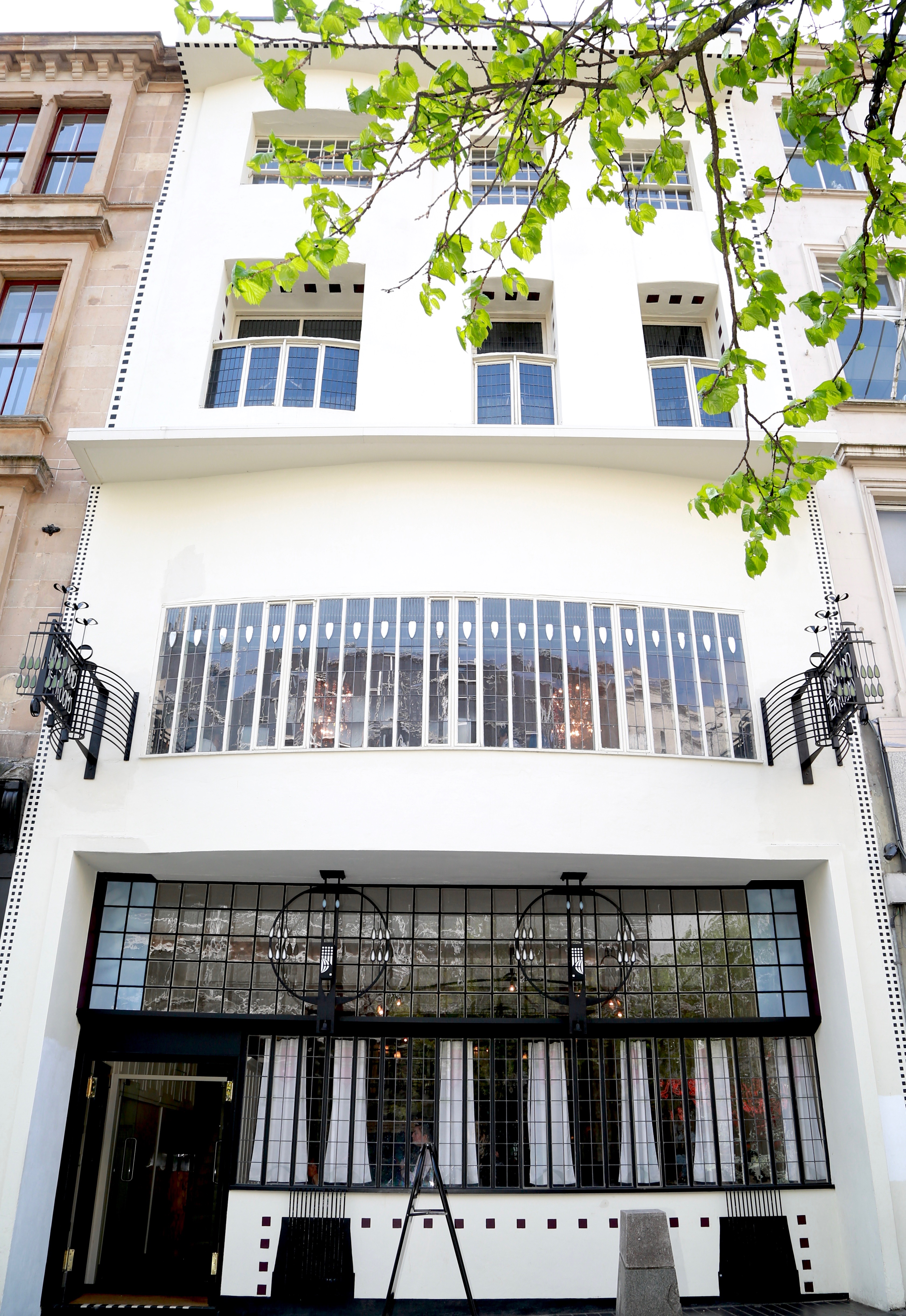
- The Mackintosh Tearooms (original Willow Tearooms building)

General information
- Status: Completed
- Architectural style: Art Nouveau
- Location: Glasgow, Scotland, 217 Sauchiehall Street
- Coordinates: 55°51′54.105″N 4°15′40.179″W
- Opened: 1903
- Client: Catherine Cranston
- Owner: National Trust for Scotland

Design and construction
- Architect: Charles Rennie Mackintosh

Website
- mackintoshatthewillow.com

The Willow Tearooms are tearooms at 217 Sauchiehall Street, Glasgow, Scotland, designed by internationally renowned architect Charles Rennie Mackintosh, which opened for business in October 1903. They quickly gained enormous popularity, and are the most famous of the many Glasgow tearooms that opened in the late 19th and early 20th century. The building was fully restored, largely to Mackintosh's original designs, between 2014 and 2018. It re-opened as working tearooms in July 2018 and traded under the name "Mackintosh at The Willow" until February 2026 when it was renamed again to "The Mackintosh Tearooms".

The name was changed following a 2017 trademark dispute with the former operator of 'The Willow Tearooms'. That name brand is now used at tearoom premises in Buchanan Street, Glasgow and, since 2024 at a venue in Princes St, Edinburgh. The name was additionally used at the Watt Brothers Department Store in Sauchiehall Street, Glasgow between 2016 and its closure in 2019.

The Tearooms at 217 Sauchiehall Street first opened in 1903 and are the only surviving tearooms designed by Mackintosh for local entrepreneur and patron Miss Catherine Cranston. Over the years and through various changes of ownership and use, the building had deteriorated until it was purchased in 2014 by The Willow Tea Rooms Trust in order to prevent the forced sale of the building, closure of the Tearooms and loss of its contents to collectors. The Tearooms are now owned by the National Trust for Scotland.

== Background ==
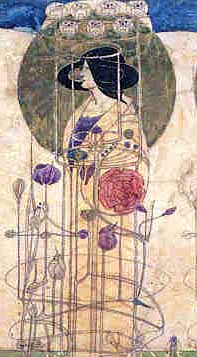
Mackintosh's design for the frieze at the Buchanan Street tearoom.

Early in his career, in 1896, Mackintosh met Catherine Cranston (widely known as Kate Cranston or simply Miss Cranston), an entrepreneurial local businesswoman who was the daughter of a Glasgow tea merchant and a strong believer in temperance.

The temperance movement was becoming increasingly popular in Glasgow at the turn of the century and Miss Cranston had conceived the idea of a series of "art tearooms", venues where people could meet to relax and enjoy non-alcoholic refreshments in a variety of different "rooms" within the same building. This proved to be the start of a long working relationship between Miss Cranston and Mackintosh. Between 1896 and 1917, he designed and re-styled interiors in all four of her Glasgow tearooms, often in collaboration with his wife Margaret Macdonald Mackintosh.

=== The early tearooms ===
Mackintosh was engaged to design the wall murals of Miss Cranston's new Buchanan Street tearooms in 1896. The tearooms had been designed and built by George Washington Browne of Edinburgh, with interiors and furnishings being designed by George Walton. Mackintosh designed stencilled friezes depicting opposing pairs of elongated female figures surrounded by roses for the ladies' tearoom, the luncheon room and the smokers' gallery.

In 1898, his next commission for the existing Argyle Street tearooms saw the design roles reversed, with Mackintosh designing the furniture and interiors, and Walton designing the wall murals. This was to see the first appearance of Mackintosh's trademark high-backed chair design. In 1900, Miss Cranston commissioned him to redesign an entire room in her Ingram Street tearooms, which resulted in the creation of the White Dining Room. Patrons entering the dining room from Ingram Street had to pass through a hallway separated from the room by a wooden screen with leaded glass inserts, offering tantalising glimpses of the experience to come.

This led to the commission to completely design the proposed new tearooms in Sauchiehall Street in 1903. For the first time, Mackintosh was given responsibility for not only the interior design and furniture, but also for the full detail of the internal layout and exterior architectural treatment. The resultant building came to be known as the Willow Tearooms, and is the best known and most important work that Mackintosh undertook for Miss Cranston.

== The Willow Tearooms ==
The Room de Luxe in the Tearooms as it was in 1903.

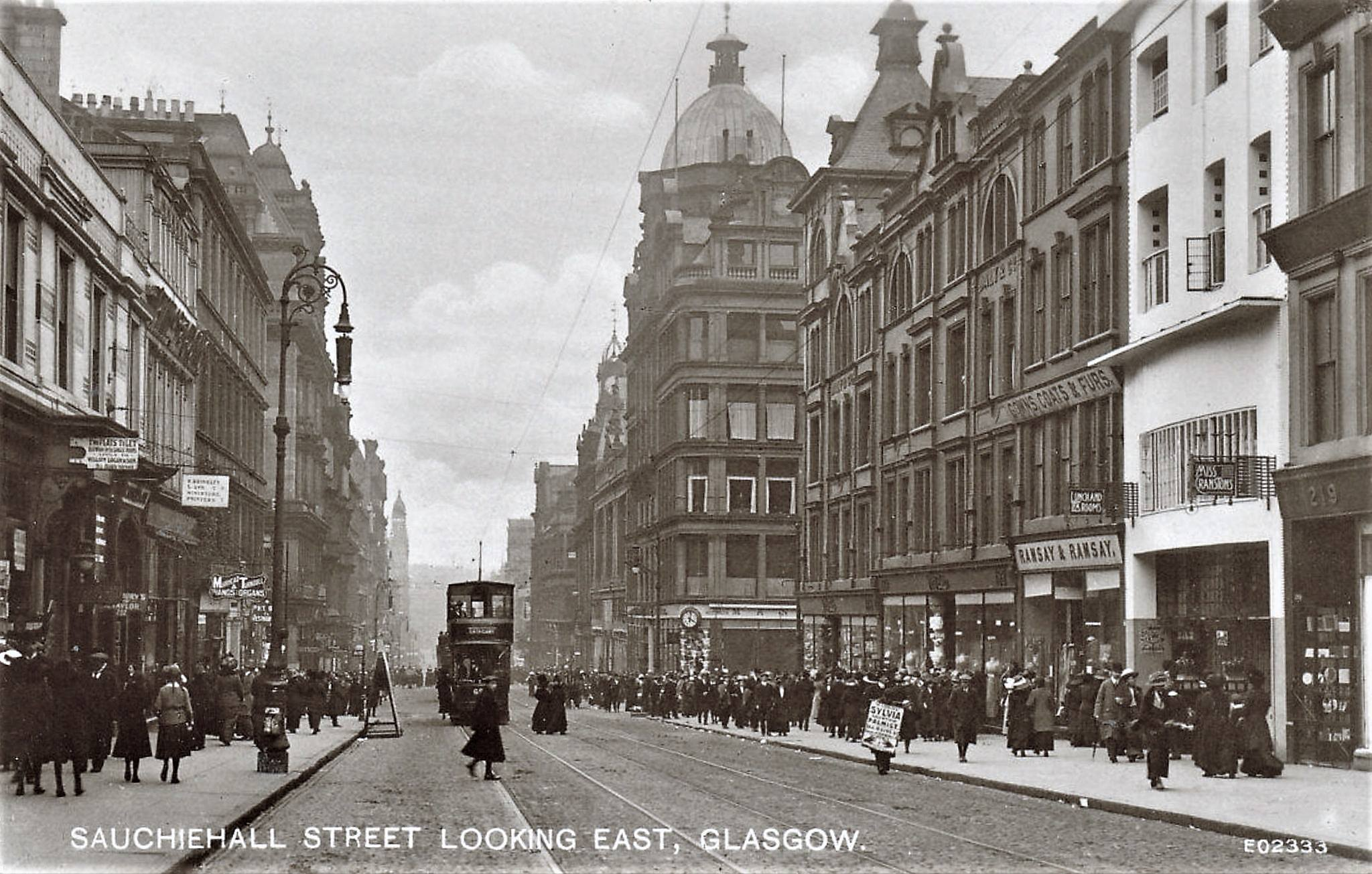
Sauchiehall Street, Glasgow, around 1914 looking east. The Willow Tearooms is shown on the right

The location selected by Miss Cranston for the new tearooms was a four-storey former warehouse building in a row of similar buildings erected around 1870 on the south side of Sauchiehall Street, between Wellington Street and Blythswood Street. These replaced original townhouses named Kensington Place, one of three such terraces built by William Harley. The street and surrounding area are part of the New Town of Blythswood created largely by William Harley of Blythswood Square in the early 1800s. The name "Sauchiehall" is derived from "saugh", the Scots word for a willow tree, and "haugh", meadow. This provided the starting point for Mackintosh and Macdonald's ideas for the design theme.

Within the existing structure, Mackintosh designed a range of spaces with different functions and décor for the Glasgow patrons to enjoy. There was a ladies' tearoom to the front of the ground floor, with a general lunch room to the back and a tea gallery above it. The first floor contained the "Room de Luxe", a more exclusive ladies' room overlooking Sauchiehall Street. The second floor contained a timber-panelled billiards room and smoking rooms for the men. The design concept foresaw a place for the ladies to meet their friends, and for the men to use on their breaks from office work – an oasis in the city centre.

The decoration of the different rooms was themed: light for feminine, dark for masculine. The ladies' tearoom at the front was white, silver, and rose; the general lunch room at the back was panelled in oak and grey canvas, and the top-lit tea gallery above was pink, white, and grey. In addition to designing the internal architectural alterations and a new external façade, in collaboration with his wife Margaret, Mackintosh designed almost every other aspect of the tearooms, including the interior design, furniture, cutlery, menus, and even the waitress uniforms. Willow was the basis for the name of the tearooms, but it also formed an integral part of the decorative motifs employed in the interior design, and much of the timberwork used in the building fabric and furniture.

=== The Room de Luxe ===
The Room de Luxe was the most extravagant of the rooms that Mackintosh created, and proved to be the tearooms' main attraction. The room was positioned on the first floor at the front of the building, slightly above the level of the tea gallery at the rear, and featured a vaulted ceiling with a full-width, slightly curved bay window looking out to Sauchiehall Street. Entrance to the room was by way of a magnificent set of double doors which featured leaded glass decoration, hinting at the colours and motifs to be found beyond.

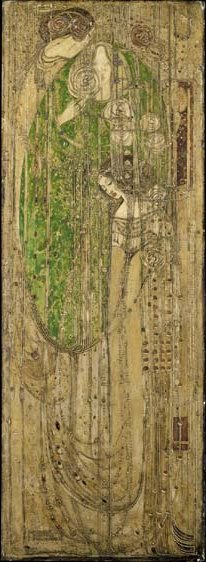
Margaret MacDonald's famous gesso panel O ye, all ye that walk in Willowood.

Described at the time as "a fantasy for afternoon tea", the room was intimate and richly decorated. It featured a sumptuous colour scheme of grey, purple and white, featuring a soft grey carpet, a silk upholstered dado, chairs and settees upholstered in a rich rose-purple, and silver painted tables with high-backed chairs. The walls were painted a simple white, with a high level frieze of coloured, mirrored and leaded glass panels. One side wall contained the fireplace and, opposite, the other wall featured one of Margaret MacDonald's most famous works, the gesso panel inspired by Rossetti's sonnet O Ye, all ye that walk in Willow Wood. This was all complemented by crisp, white tablecloths and blue willow-pattern crockery.

The luxurious decoration of the room can be understood as a logical extension of the Mackintoshes' stylistic development from 1900, where they would develop all-encompassing interior designs for domestic commissions, and then transfer these to their designs for commercial projects and exhibitions. Their colourful interior designs in the House for an Art Lover culminated in the Room de Luxe interior as a commercial vision of the European idea of the room as a work of art.

=== The external façade ===
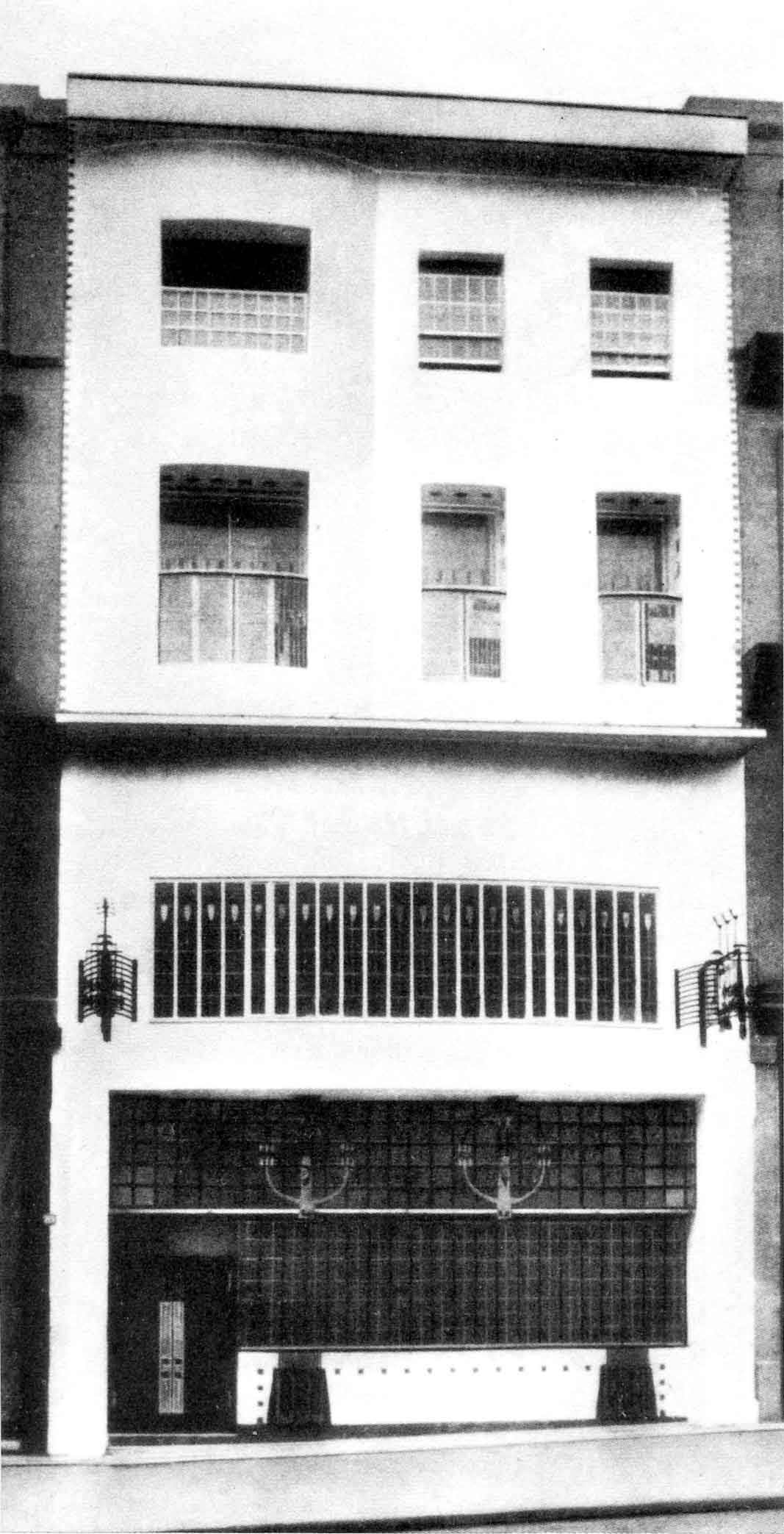
The Willow Tearooms frontage on Sauchiehall Street, around 1903.

Mackintosh's redesigned external façade was a carefully considered asymmetric, abstractly modelled composition with shallow curves on some areas of the surface, and varying depths of recesses to windows and the main entrance. The composition respected the urban context of the neighbouring buildings, matching the major cornice lines and heights of adjoining buildings, whilst still exploring emerging ideas of Art Nouveau and the modern movement.

The ground floor entrance door is placed far to the left of a wide band of fenestration, both of which are recessed below the first-floor level, the location of the Room de Luxe. To emphasise the importance of this room, Mackintosh designed a full-width bay window, projecting the façade outwards with a gentle curve. The two storeys above this featured a more regular pattern of fenestration with three individual windows per floor, recessed to different degrees. The asymmetry of the composition was continued by widening the left side windows and creating another gentle curve in this part of the façade, extending through both storeys. This repeated the curved form of the first floor and emphasised the heavily recessed entrance to the building below.

Mackintosh chose to finish the façade in a white-painted smooth render, in contrast to the natural stone finish of nearby buildings. This decision, plus the use of small paned windows and ornamental tile inserts forming a chequered border around the perimeter of the façade, gave it an elegance and lightness of touch appropriate for its purpose. The domestic-style leaded glass announced the intimacy of the interior and hinted at the luxurious willow theme to be found inside.

== The Willow Tearooms today ==
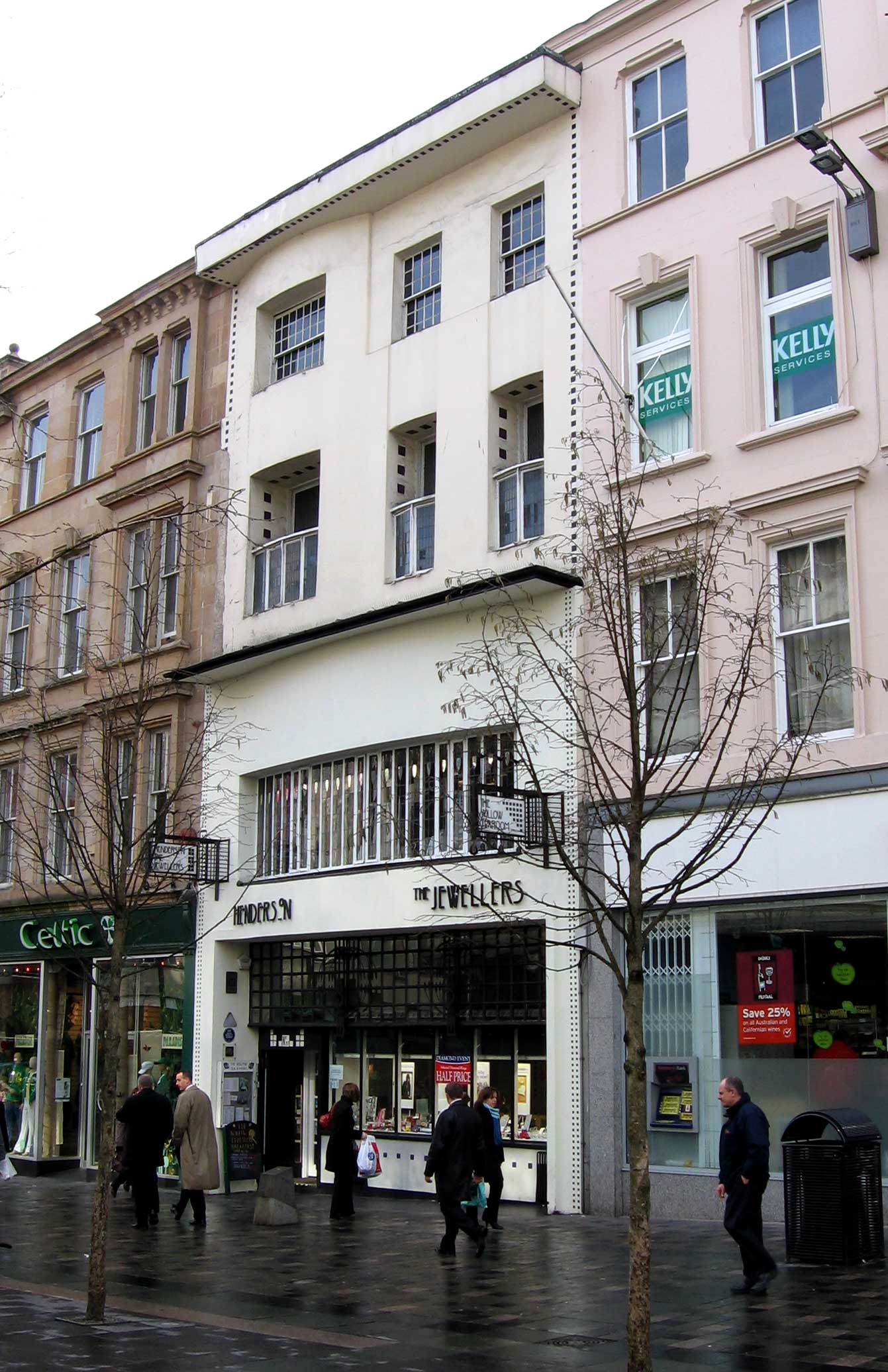
Exterior in 2006

Following the death of her husband in 1917, Miss Cranston sold her businesses. The Willow Tearooms continued in use under a new name until they were incorporated into Daly's department store in 1928. By 1938, the others had passed into the hands of Cranston's Tearooms Ltd. When this company went into liquidation in 1954 the tearooms were sold and subsequently put to a number of different uses over the years. Though Daly's adapted the Willow Tearooms building as part of their department store, the façade was unchanged above their ground floor plate glass shop window and fascia, the moulded plaster frieze could still be seen above the ground floor shopfittings, and the Room de Luxe remained in use as the department store tearoom until they closed around the start of the 1980s.

Extensive restoration work was carried out under the architect Geoffrey Wimpenny of Keppie Henderson, successors of the Honeyman, Keppie and Mackintosh partnership of almost a century earlier. The Willow Tearooms reopened in 1983 with the restored ground floor façade forming the shop front to Henderson the jewellers which occupied the ground floor and the reconstructed gallery.

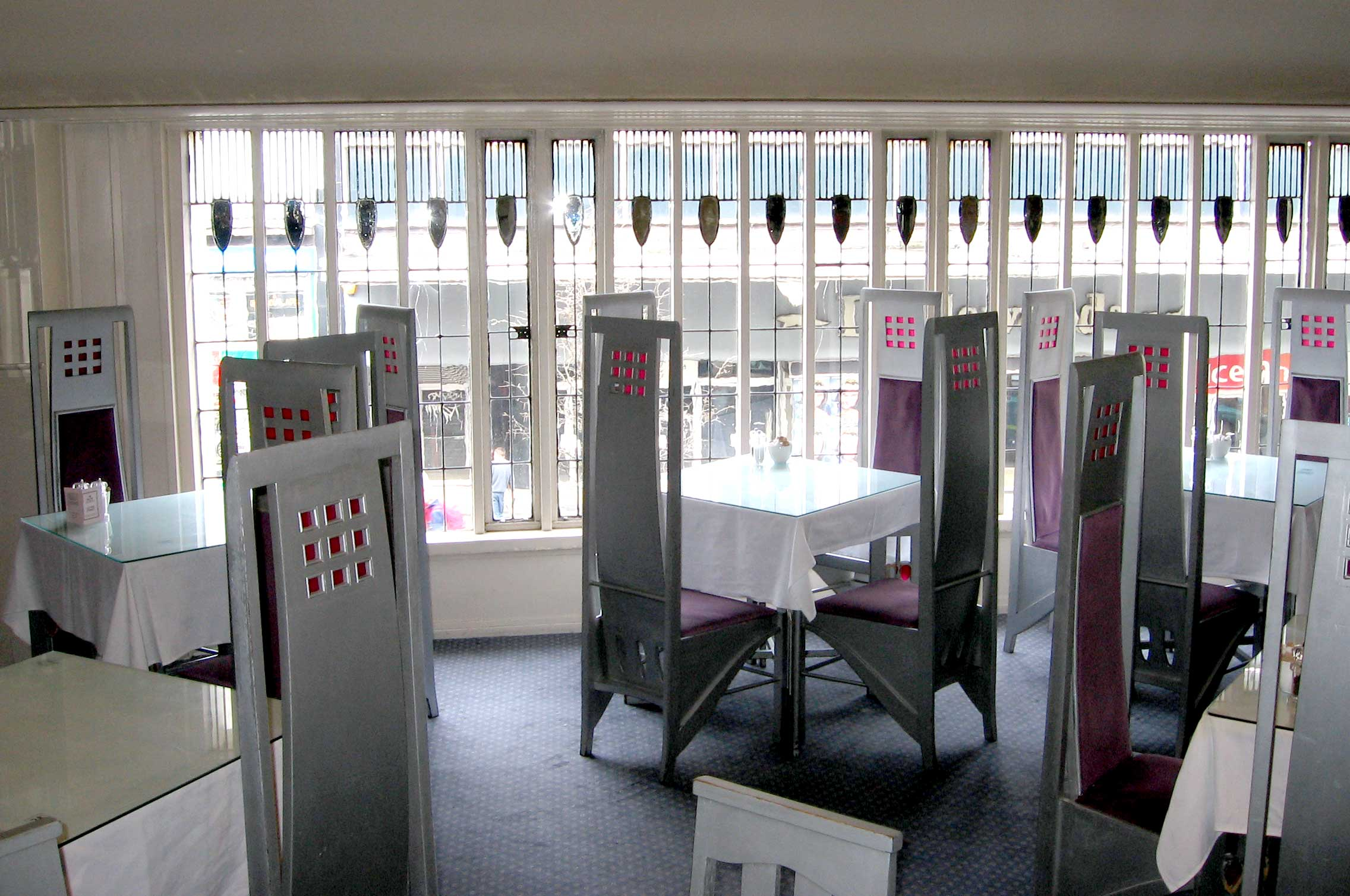
The Room de Luxe in 2006

At the same time, the Room de Luxe was refurbished to recreate the original colour scheme, and furnished with reproductions of the high back chairs, though originally there were only eight of these chairs at formal central tables while chairs around the perimeter had lower backs. It was reopened in 1983 by Anne Mulhern, a Glasgow businesswoman, and in 1996 she also leased the tea gallery at the rear of the building. The ground floor was occupied by Hendersons, a jewellery business until 2013 when the whole building was taken over by Mulhern to operate as "The Willow Tearooms". This business continued in its Buchanan Street premises and also operated within the Watts Brothers department store between 2016 and 2019. After being sold on in 2019, it still operates at Buchanan Street under new ownership by The Princes Restaurant Group and a further venue was opened under 'The Willow Tearooms' brand by them in Edinburgh in 2024.

In 2014, the Sauchiehall Street building was bought by Glasgow businesswoman, Celia Sinclair in order to prevent the forced sale of the building, closure of the Tearooms and loss of its contents to collectors as the landlord had gone into receivership. The building was subsequently in the ownership of 'The Willow Tea Rooms Trust', a registered charity. The aims and objectives of the Trust included the restoration and preservation of the Tearooms as part of Scotland's heritage and for the benefit of the general public.

The restoration of the building during 2014–2018 was budgeted at £10 million and was funded through a mixture of private and grant money including almost £4 million from The Heritage Lottery Fund, The Monument Trust, Historic Environment Scotland, Glasgow City Heritage Trust, Glasgow City Council, Dunard Fund and Architectural Heritage Fund. Following an international competition run by the Royal Incorporation of Architects in Scotland, Simpson & Brown were appointed as conservation architects and lead design consultants. The restoration project is complemented by the creation of a retail outlet, education, conferencing and visitor centre in the adjoining 215 Sauchiehall Street premises. The restoration of no 217 included extensive re-creation of Mackintosh's interior schemes and decorative elements lost over the years. Large quantities of furniture to Mackintosh's designs have also been reproduced for use in the various parts of the Tearooms (the originals being lost or in private and museum collections throughout the world). One of the most celebrated spaces in the building, the Room de Luxe, has been fully restored and includes a suite of specially commissioned furniture, re-created chandeliers, gesso panels and carpets. Culturally significant as a venue in Glasgow where women first began to socialise outside the home, this room is once again used for its original purpose.

The Tearooms were operated under the governance of the Trust as a social enterprise, with the objectives of creating training, learning, employment and other opportunities and support for young people and communities. The Prince's Trust and Dumfries House are partners in providing training for the young people who work at the Tearooms and receive training and career-building experience. In January 2024, it was announced that the National Trust for Scotland (NTS) had acquired ownership of the Tearooms from the Willow Tea Rooms Trust. Long term survival of the venue following external financial pressures during the immediate preceding years was cited as the key factor in the change of ownership. On 12 February 2026 the NTS announced that the business name had been changed to 'The Mackintosh Tearooms' stating that the name change "connects it clearly to Charles Rennie Mackintosh and the contribution he and his wife Margaret Macdonald (who produced designs for the interior) made to Scotland and the world."

== In literature and popular culture ==
Neil Munro provided an account of a visit by Erchie MacPherson and his friend Duffy to the Willow Tearooms first published in his 'The Looker-On' column in The Glasgow Evening News in 1904.
