= Catherine Cranston =

Leading figure in the development of tea rooms (1849 – 1934)

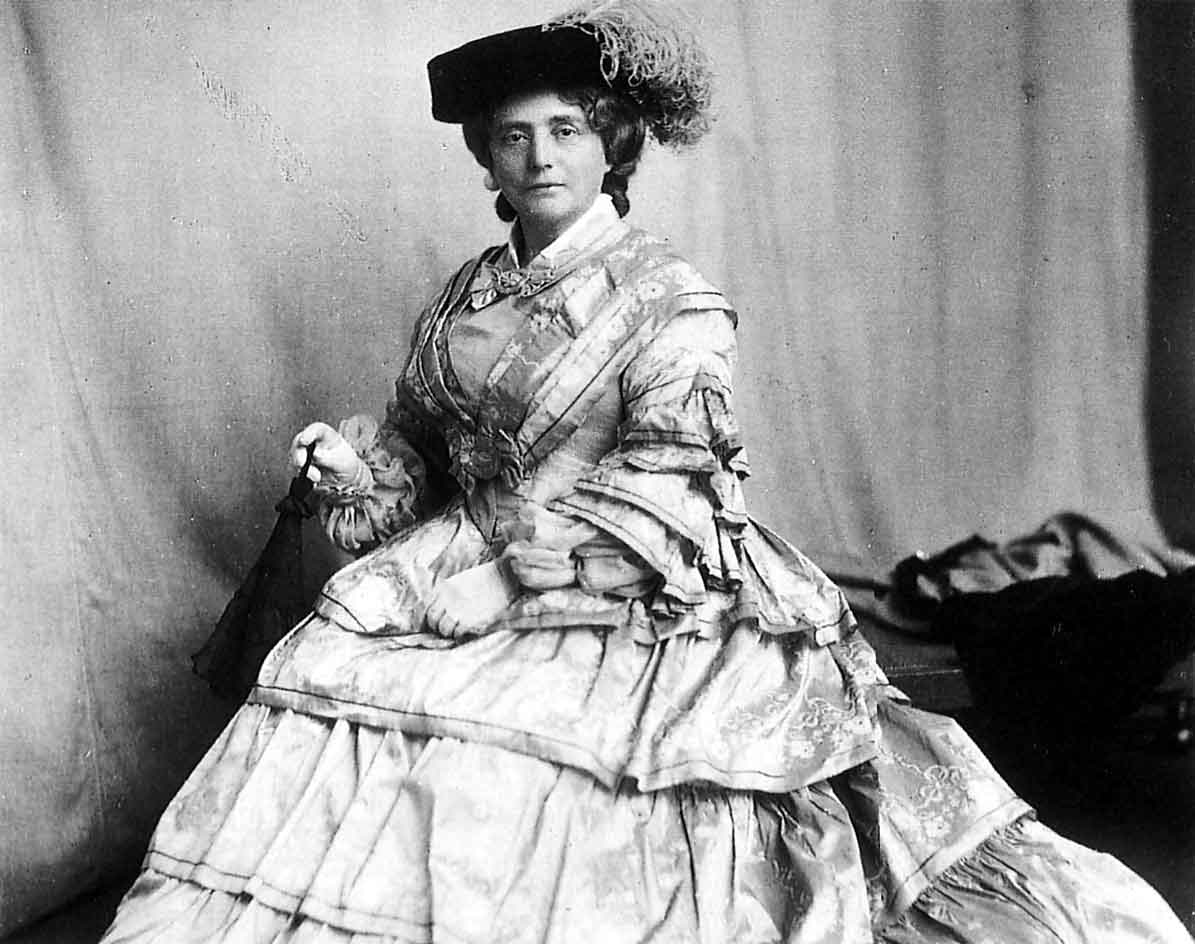
- Catherine "Kate" Cranston, around 1903
- Born: Catherine Cranston; May 27, 1849; Glasgow, Scotland
- Died: April 18, 1934 (aged 84)
- Resting place: Neilston Cemetery, Scotland
- Other names: Kate Cranston, Miss Cranston
- Occupations: Businesswoman, tea room proprietor
- Known for: Leading figure in the development of tea rooms; patron of Charles Rennie Mackintosh
- Spouse: John Cochrane (m. 1892)

Catherine Cranston (27 May 1849 – 18 April 1934), widely known as Kate Cranston or Miss Cranston, was a leading figure in the development of tea rooms. She is nowadays chiefly remembered as a major patron of Charles Rennie Mackintosh and Margaret MacDonald, in Glasgow, Scotland. The name of Miss Cranston's Tea Rooms lives on in reminiscences of Glasgow in its heyday.

== Background ==
Her father, George Cranston, was a baker and pastry maker and, in 1849, the year of her birth, he became proprietor of the Edinburgh and Glasgow Railway Chop House and Commercial Lodgings at No. 39 George Square in Glasgow city centre. The hotel was renamed the Royal Horse, then renamed again in May 1852 to become Cranston's Hotel and Dining Rooms, offering:

"Convenient Coffee room and detached Smoking Rooms on Ground Floor, commodious Commercial Room and Parlour, comfortable Bed-rooms and Baths, &c. Coffee always ready. Cigars, wines, spirits, ales, Newspapers, Time-Tables, Writing Materials. Superior and varied Bill of Fare at the usual moderate charges.

Her slightly older brother Stuart (1848–1921) became a tea dealer and, according to Glasgow in 1901, was "a pioneer of the business" there of "tea shops pure and simple" who by 1901 had three such tearooms offering nothing more substantial to eat than a sandwich. Kate went on to create much more of a social facility.

Like other cities in the United Kingdom, Glasgow was then a centre of the temperance movement which sought an alternative to male-centred pubs. Tea had previously been a luxury for the rich, but from the 1830s it was promoted as an alternative to alcoholic drinks, and many new cafés and coffee houses were opened, catering more for ordinary people. However it was not until the 1880s that tea rooms and tea shops became popular and fashionable.

== Personal life ==
Although she was known professionally as "Miss Cranston", Kate married Major John Cochrane, an engineer, and Provost of Barrhead in 1892.

The couple lived in a semi-detached villa in Carlibar Road in Barrhead. As a wedding gift, John commissioned a redesign of the principal rooms by architect and interior designer George Walton, the brother of the well-known artist E A Walton. Some years later, they moved to a much larger mansion house called "Househill" in the nearby village of Nitshill. This time, Charles Rennie Mackintosh was commissioned to re-design the interior in 1904, and the completed house became known as Hous'hill.

John died at sixty years old on 22 October 1917 in Barrhead after a short illness. Kate retired from public life, sold off her tea rooms and other businesses, and was said to have worn black thereafter in memory of him. They had no children, so when she died in 1934, she left two-thirds of her estate to the poor of Glasgow. She is buried with her husband and his family in Neilston Cemetery.

== Miss Cranston's Tea Rooms ==
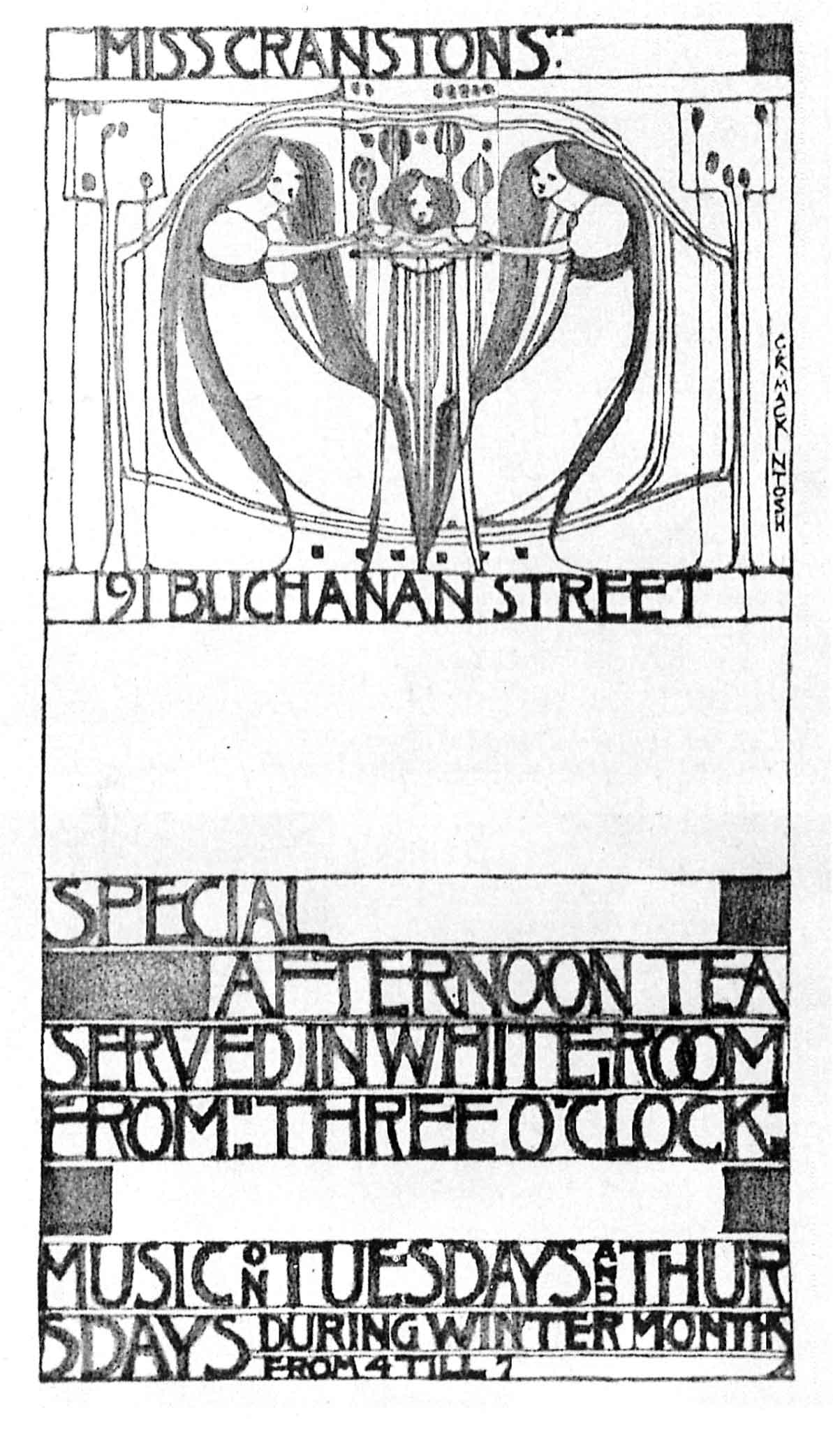
Poster design by Charles Rennie Mackintosh.

In 1878 Miss Kate Cranston opened her first tearoom, the Crown Luncheon Room, on Argyle Street, Glasgow. She set high standards of service, food quality and cleanliness, and her innovation lay in seeing the social need for something more than a restaurant or a simple "tea shop", and in putting equal attention into providing amenities designed in the latest style. Her first tearoom was decorated in a contemporary baronial style. On 16 September 1886 she opened her Ingram Street tearoom and in 1888 commissioned George Walton to decorate a new smoking room in the Arts and Crafts style in one of her tea rooms.

She opened new tearooms in Buchanan Street in 1897 (designed by George Washington Browne), expanded to take over the whole building in Argyle Street by 1898 (designed by H and D Barclay), then completed her chain of four establishments with the Willow Tearooms (by Charles Rennie Mackintosh) in Sauchiehall Street, opened in 1903.

While other cities offered very expensive and very basic tea rooms by 1901, Kate Cranston set the standard in Glasgow for more welcoming establishments. Rooms were provided for ladies only and for gentlemen only, as well as luncheon rooms where they could dine together and smoking rooms and billiards rooms for the gentlemen. Miss Cranston's Tea Rooms became social centres for all, for business men and apprentices, for ladies and ladies' maids. The Ladies Rooms were a particular success, newly allowing respectable women to get out and meet together without male company. Unlike cafes or tearooms in other cities, there was no intrusive supervision and those having tea had an assortment of scones and cakes to hand, with a discreet notice reminding newcomers to remember the amount consumed. At "the accounting", Glasgow in 1901 reported, "One states the amount of ones indebtedness, and receives a check therefor from the attendant maiden. This, with the corresponding coin or coins, one hands in at the pay-desk, and so home. Nothing could be simpler or less irritating."

The city was a centre of artistic innovation at the time, and the tearooms served as art galleries for paintings by the "Glasgow Boys". The architect Sir Edwin Lutyens visited the Buchanan Street tearoom in 1898, finding it "just a little outré", and wrote from there to his wife that "Miss Cranston is now Mrs. Cochrane, a dark, fat wee body with black sparkling luminous eyes, wears a bonnet garnished with roses, and has made a fortune by supplying cheap clean goods in surroundings prompted by the New Art Glasgow School."

Tea rooms opened around the city, and in the late 1880s fine hotels elsewhere in Britain and in America began to offer tea service in tea rooms and tea courts. Glasgow in 1901 reported that "Glasgow, in truth, is a very Tokio for tea-rooms. Nowhere can one have so much for so little, and nowhere are such places more popular and frequented." and that "It is not the accent of the people, nor the painted houses, nor yet the absence of Highland policemen that makes the Glasgow man in London feel that he is in a foreign town and far from home. It is a simpler matter. It is the lack of tea-shops." The original Sauchiehall Street tearoom building has been restored and reopened in 2018. The adjacent building has been converted to serve as a visitor centre and retail space. The 'Willow Tearooms' brand has been separated from the building and is now run privately at a location in Buchanan Street adjacent to Miss Cranston's original premises. This location features recreated Mackintosh furniture and interior features. The restored Willow Tea Rooms building now trades as "Mackintosh at The Willow".

=== Walton and Mackintosh ===
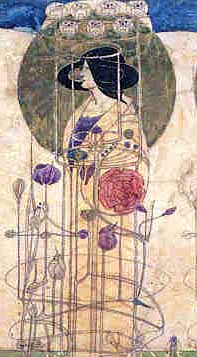
Mackintosh's design for the frieze at the Buchanan Street tearoom.

George Walton set up George Walton & Co, Ecclesiastical and House Decorators on the basis of his 1888 commission from Kate Cranston, and in 1896 was commissioned by her to design the interiors of new tearooms, designed and built by George Washington Browne of Edinburgh, at 91–93 Buchanan Street, which opened the following year. He was assisted in this by Charles Rennie Mackintosh who designed wall murals in the form of stencilled friezes depicting opposing pairs of elongated female figures surrounded by roses for the ladies' tearoom, the luncheon room and the smokers' gallery.

"It is believed (and averred) that in no other town can you see in a place of refreshment such ingenious and beautiful decorations in the style of the new art as in Miss Cranston's shop in Buchanan Street. Indeed, so general in the city is this belief that it has caused the Glasgow man of the better sort to coin a new adjective denoting the height of beauty... 'It's quite Kate Cranston-ish !' "

Kate Cranston expanded her first tearoom to take over the whole building at 114 Argyle Street and commissioned Walton to design a new more modern interior, which opened in 1898. Walton's work included fireplaces, stencilled wall murals and stained glass panels for the doors. In the luncheon room the murals and door panels had a rose pattern theme. The furniture was designed by Mackintosh, introducing for the first time his characteristic high-backed chairs.

In 1900 Kate Cranston gave Mackintosh the opportunity to redesign an entire room, at the Ingram Street tearoom. He had just recently married the artist Margaret MacDonald, and together they created the White Dining Room, including a hallway opening onto the street and divided off by a wooden screen with leaded glass panels, giving those entering glimpses into the room itself. His fame was spreading, and in 1902 The Studio wrote of "Miss Cranston, whose tea-rooms, designed by Mr. Mackintosh, are reckoned by some of the pilgrims to Glasgow as one of the sights of the city."

=== The Willow Tearooms ===
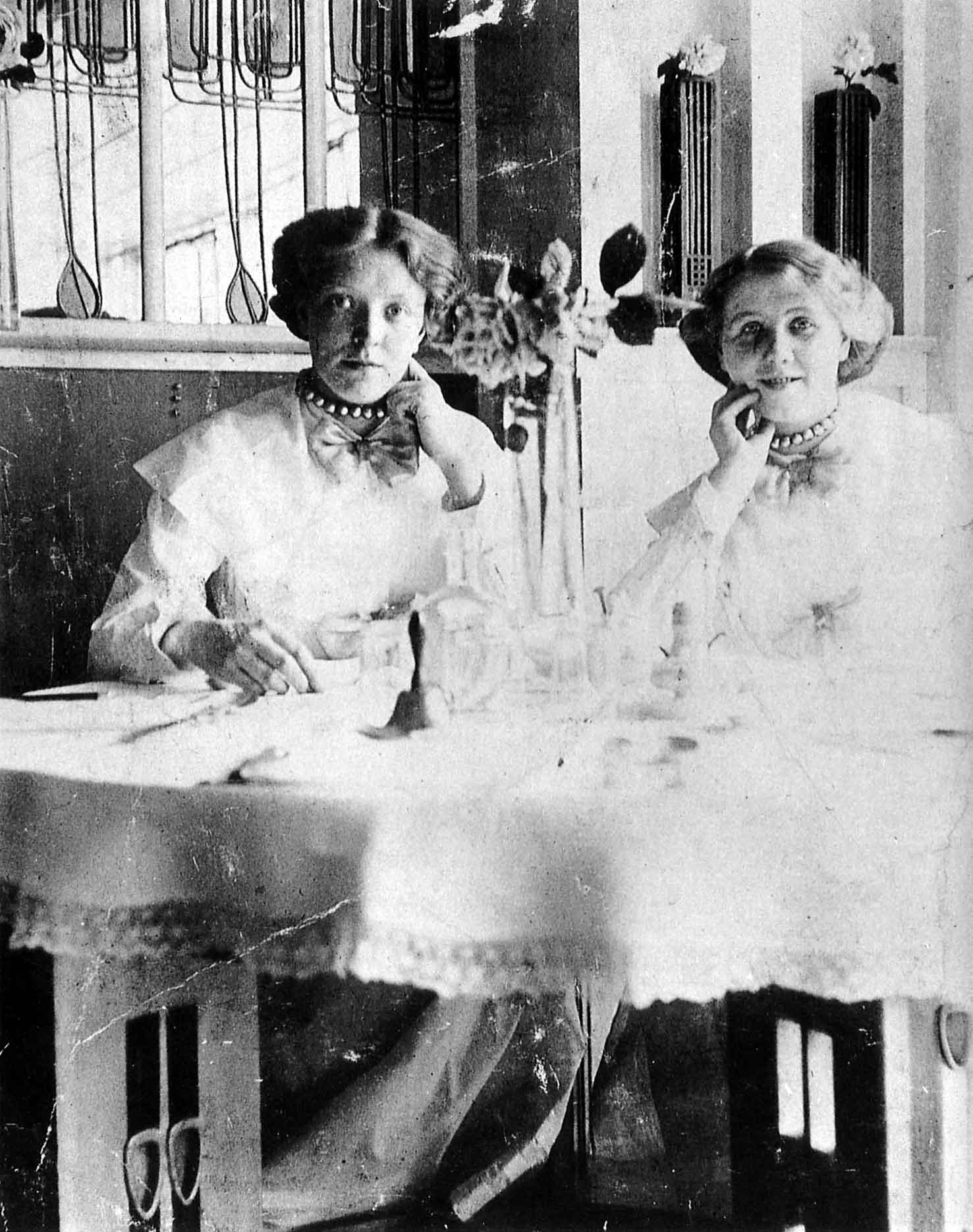
Miss Cranston's waitresses, seen in the Room de Luxe of the Willow Tea Rooms.

Next Kate Cranston gave Mackintosh the major commission for an entire building in Sauchiehall Street, again in collaboration with his wife Margaret MacDonald on designs for the interiors. Behind a strikingly simple new façade this building provided three interlinked main tearooms at the ground floor and on a first floor gallery, with steps from that leading up a further half-storey to the famous "Room de Luxe" stretching the width of the building above the main entrance and front tearoom.

In a humorous review of the new tearoom for the Glasgow Evening News titled Erchie in an Art Tea Room, Neil Munro described the "Room de Looks":

"The chairs is no like ony ither chairs ever I clapped eyes on, but ye could easy guess they were chairs, and a' roond the place there's a lump o' looking-gless wi' purple leeks pented on it every noo and then."

In 1905 Dekorative Kunst featured a special issue about the Willow Tea Rooms written by Hermann Muthesius who advised that "Today any visitor to Glasgow can rest body and soul in Miss Cranston's Tea Rooms and for a few pence drink tea, have breakfast and dream that he is in fairy land."

=== Further projects ===
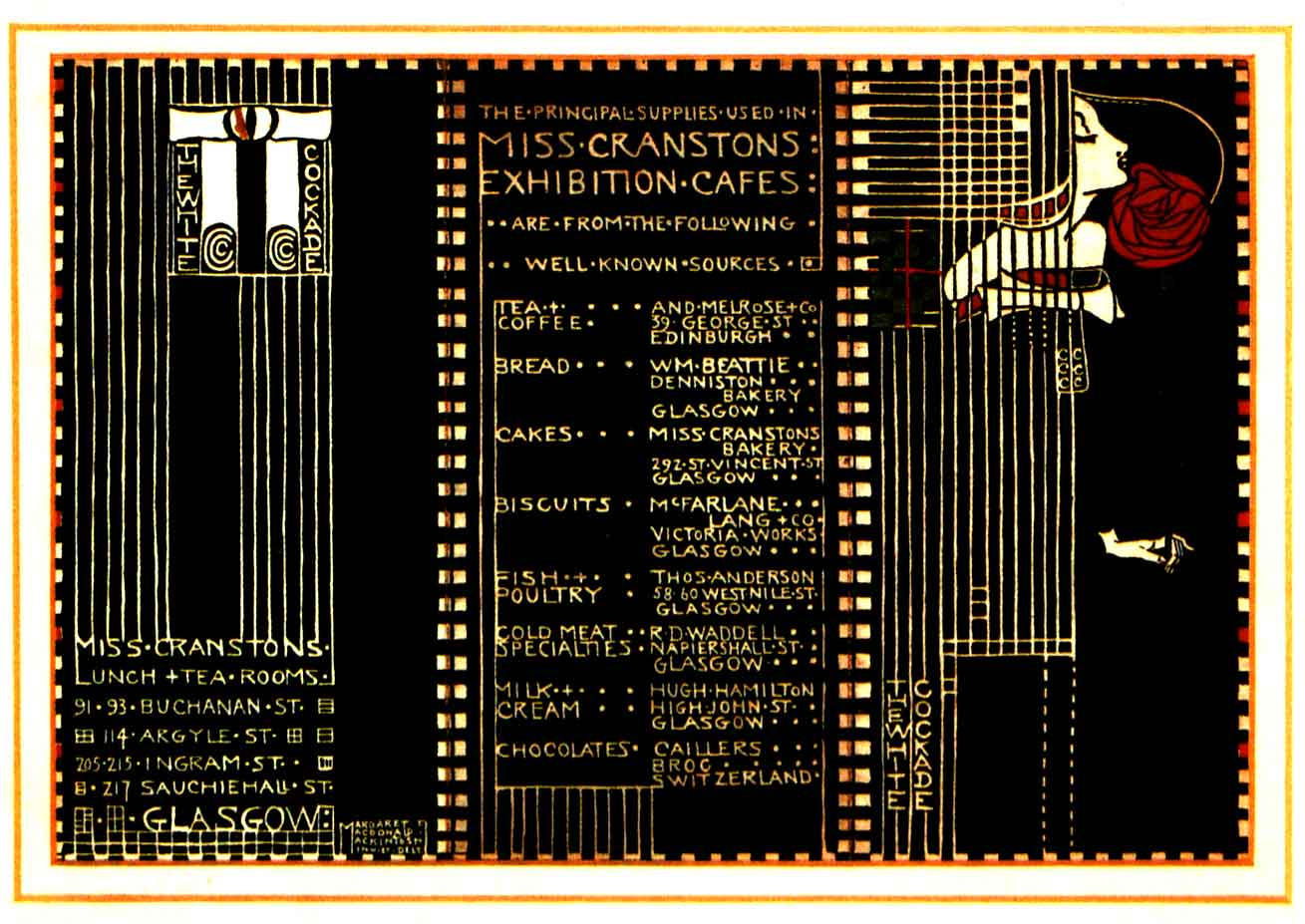
Menu design by Margaret MacDonald Mackintosh.

Although the Willow Tearooms completed her chain, and remains the most famous of her tea rooms, Kate Cranston carried out several more projects, and Mackintosh provided increasingly innovative designs. In 1904 she commissioned him to carry out the redecoration and design of new furniture for the mansion of Hous'hill near Nitshill which was home to herself and her husband John Cochrane.

Mackintosh carried out further work on the Argyle Street tearoom in 1906 to design a basement conversion to form The Dutch kitchen. He did further redesigns for rooms in the Ingram Street tearooms, creating the Cloister Room and the Chinese Room in 1911. The latter provides an exotic fantasy, with bright blue finished timber screens incorporating a cashier's kiosk, elaborate door lintels and dark blue finished furniture, all in Mackintosh's version of an oriental style.

In the same year Kate Cranston provided temporary "Exhibition Cafes" at the Scottish International Exhibition, apparently set up and designed by Charles Rennie Mackintosh, though nothing is now known of his scheme for this. The menu card designed by Margaret MacDonald Mackintosh shows the name for the tearooms, The White Cockade, but makes no visual connection with this reference to Jacobitism. It gives credit for supply of cakes to Miss Cranstons Bakery, 292 St Vincent St., Glasgow.

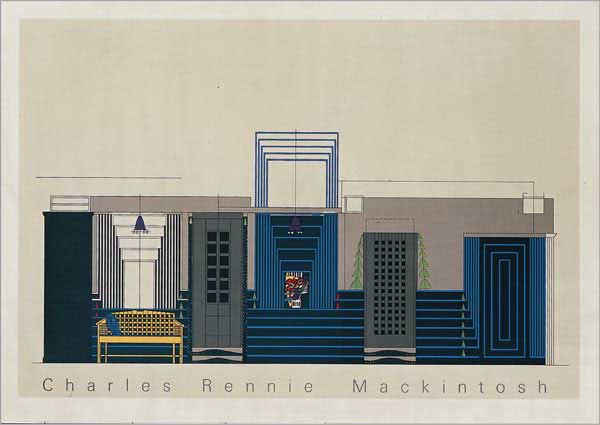
Design for The Dug Out.

In 1916 Kate opened Cranston's Cinema De Luxe in an entertainment complex designed for her by the architect James Miller, occupying the third floor of a six-storey building in Renfield Street, Glasgow.

In 1917 Mackintosh carried out his last commission for Kate Cranston, and indeed one of his last architectural works to be constructed, with the design of an extension of the Willow Tea Rooms into the basement of the building next door to create The Dug Out in a style that anticipated Art Deco.

== Legacy ==
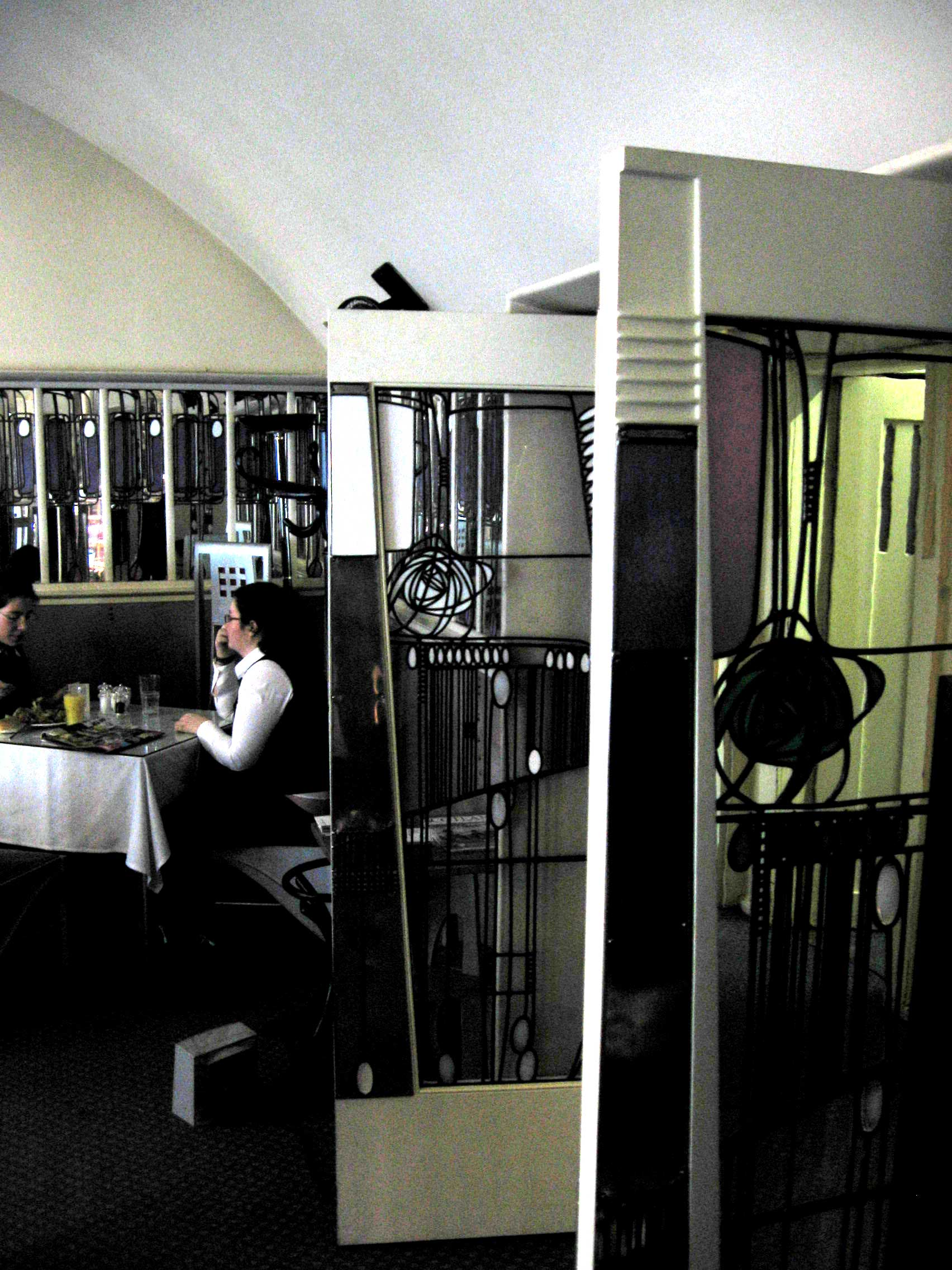
The Room de Luxe of the Willow Tearooms today.

Even though Kate Cranston had sold her tea rooms off, the name Miss Cranston's Tea Rooms long remained a byword for quality and for memories of Glasgow's heyday at the turn of the century. By 1938 tea rooms at 43 Argyll Arcade, 28 Buchanan Street, Renfield Street and Queen Street were being run by Cranston's Tea Rooms Ltd. They went into liquidation in 1954 and their premises were sold on for other uses.

The Willow Tearooms were renamed, then in 1928 they were sold on to Daly's department store who incorporated the premises into their shop, keeping the Room de Luxe in operation as the department store tea room.

Miss Cranston's Tearooms on Ingram Street continued in use as catering facilities from 1930 for Cooper's & Co., then in 1950 the rooms came into the ownership of Glasgow City Council and were used for storage and a souvenir shop. In 1971 the furnishings were removed into storage when the building was demolished, and they are now the only original set of Mackintosh tearoom interiors to survive. Ownership was transferred to Glasgow Museums in 1978, and after a further period of storage restoration work began in 1993. The Ladies' Luncheon Room was exhibited three years later, and the Chinese Room and Cloister Room have since been restored. The Glasgow Museums website reports that they are "currently assessing what will be needed to research and preserve the Charles Rennie Mackintosh interiors of the Ingram Street Tearooms for future public display." and prospective plans now exist to install at least some of the interiors at the new V&A museum in Dundee. It was decided to conserve and restore the Oak Room designed by Charles Rennie Mackintosh for the V&A Museum of Design in Dundee. A short documentary about the conservation of the Oak Room was also commissioned by the V&A museum.

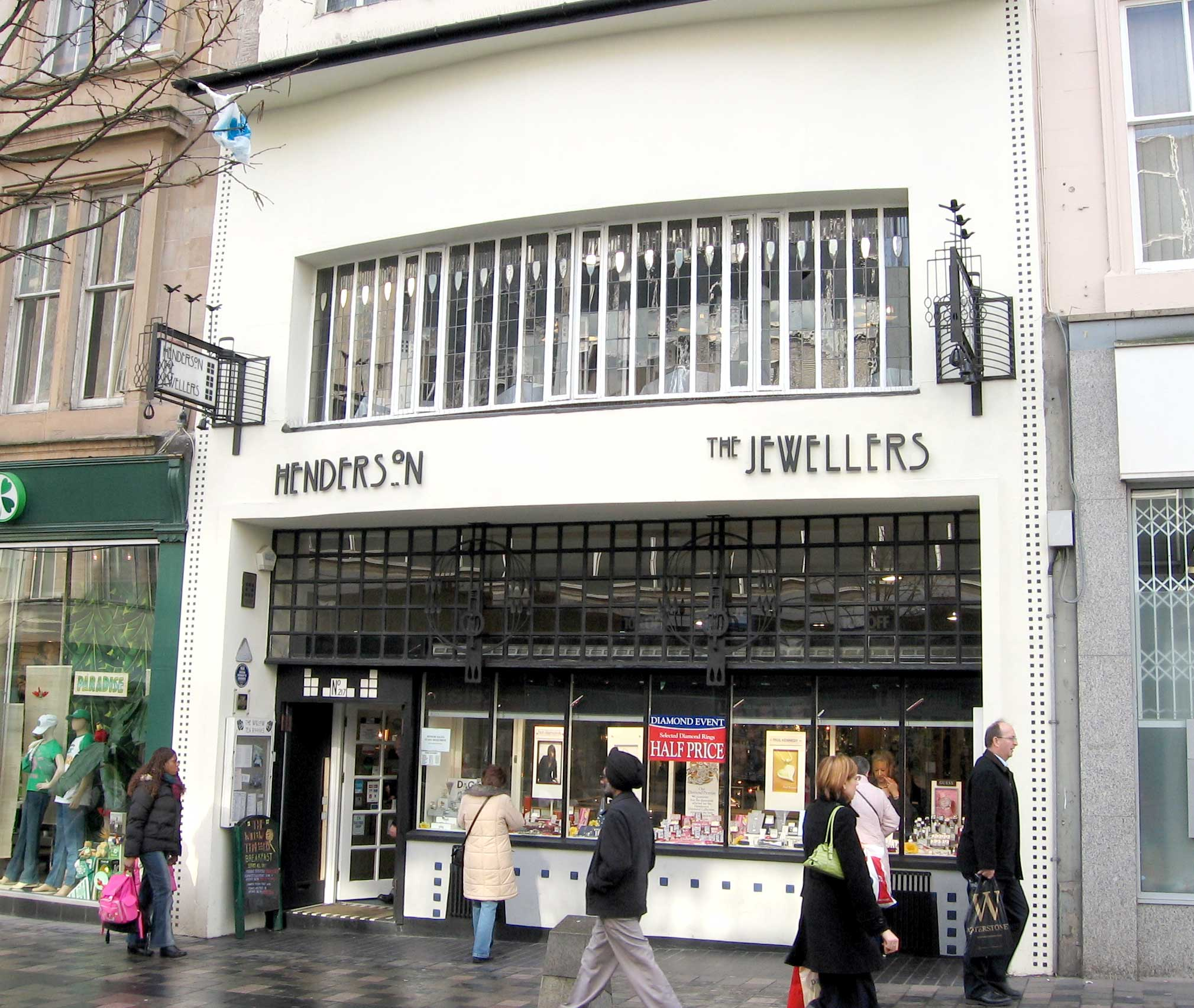
The restored Willow Tearooms building.

While Mackintosh's reputation was eclipsed by the 1920s, he was later recognised as a pioneer of modern architecture, particularly in terms of the exterior of the Willow Tea Rooms. In the 1960s a resurgence of interest in Art Nouveau brought him international fame, and the furniture and designs he and his wife created for Kate Cranston are now extremely valuable.

When Daly's closed, the Willow Tea Rooms were restored to an approximation of their original appearance. Catering reopened in the Room de Luxe, later extending to the recreated Tea Gallery. The owner of the business also opened a new tearoom on the first floor of a building in Buchanan Street, near the original Buchanan Street and Ingram Street tearooms, fitted out with replicas of the White Dining Room and the Chinese Room from the Ingram Street Tearoom. Following closure of the Sauchiehall Street building for restoration in 2014 a branch of "The Willow Tea Rooms" also operated within the Watt Brothers Department Store further up Sauchiehall Street between 2016 and its closure in 2019.

Following a trade mark dispute which was resolved in 2017 the Buchanan Street location now trades under the name of "The Willow Tea Rooms".

These new tearooms draw renewed attention to the contribution Cranston's patronage made to Mackintosh's work, and the impact she had on the social life of Glasgow is still remembered in popular books such as Tea at Miss Cranston's. The restoration and re-opening of the original Willow Tea Rooms building in 2018 has created further interest in this heritage which is served by an extensive interpretation centre located in the adjacent building.

The continuing interest in Miss Cranston is also reflected in the prices realised for items associated with her tearooms; for example £940 for six pieces of cutlery stamped Miss Cranston's.

In October 2018, it was announced that Cranston would feature on a design for The Royal Bank of Scotland £20 note to be circulated in 2020, the first woman other than Queen Elizabeth II to be depicted on a banknote of that denomination in that country (images of Nan Shepherd had been on a £5, Mary Somerville and Mary Slessor on a £10 and Elsie Inglis on a £50 in the past, while notes issued by English banks had already featured Elizabeth Fry, Florence Nightingale and Jane Austen).

== See also ==
- People on Scottish banknotes
