= Morton Sundour =

British textile manufacturer

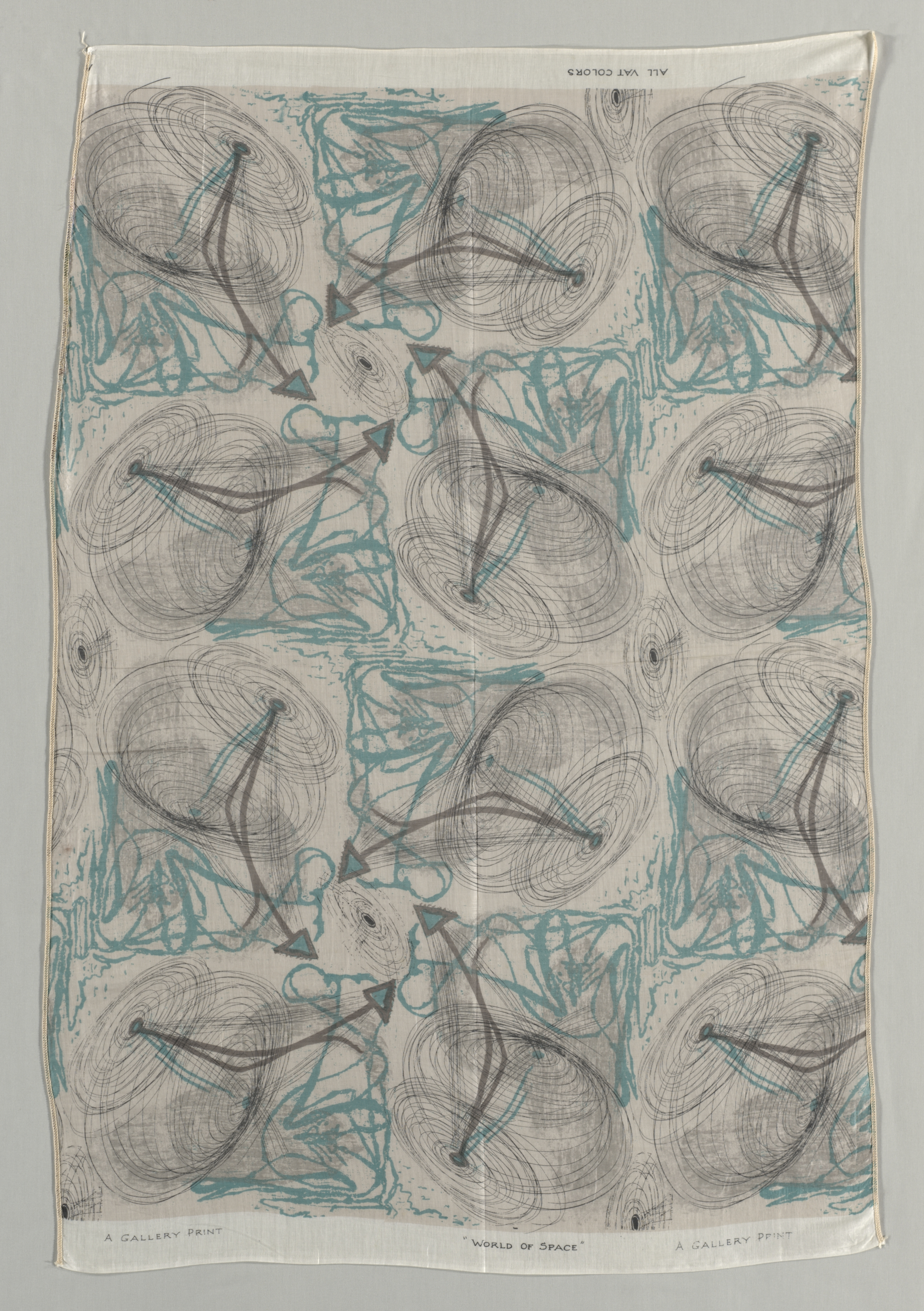
World of Space, a Morton Sundour fabric

Morton Sundour Fabrics Limited was a British textile manufacturer based at Dentonhill, Carlisle, England. In 1980, it was called "one of Britain's major textile firms". It ceased trading in November 1996.

It was founded in 1914, by Alexander Morton who reorganised his Alexander Morton and Company Ltd, with Morton Sundour as "the major off-shoot". It was run by his second son James Morton.

They were particularly known for their furnishing fabrics.

Some of their fabrics are in the collection of the Victoria and Albert Museum, London.

People who created designs for them included George Henry Walton, Minnie McLeish, and the London Underground poster designer Charles Paine.
