= Harry Peach =

Harry Hardy Peach
- Born: 1874; Toronto, Canada
- Died: 1936 (aged 61–62); Leicester, England
- Occupations: Businessman, author, campaigner
- Known for: Campaigner for improved conditions in factories and the establishment of the Design and Industries Association
- Spouse: Marina Peach (died 1913) Mabel Watson (m. 1915)
- Children: 6

Harry Hardy Peach (1874–24 January 1936) was an English businessman and author involved in campaigning for improved conditions in factories and the establishment of the Design and Industries Association and the Council for the Preservation of Rural England.

== Early life and family ==
Peach was born in Toronto, Canada to parents from Nottinghamshire, England. When he was three years old, the family returned to Britain and lived in Oadby, Leicestershire where his father worked as an estate agent. He attended Wyggeston Boys’ Grammar School and Oakham School.

Peach married twice. With his first wife, Marina, he had six children, one of whom died in infancy. Marina died in 1913. In 1915, he married Mabel Watson.

Peach died on 24 January 1936 at his home in Leicester. He had suffered from neuritis throughout his life and periods of ill health during the 1930s.

== Career ==
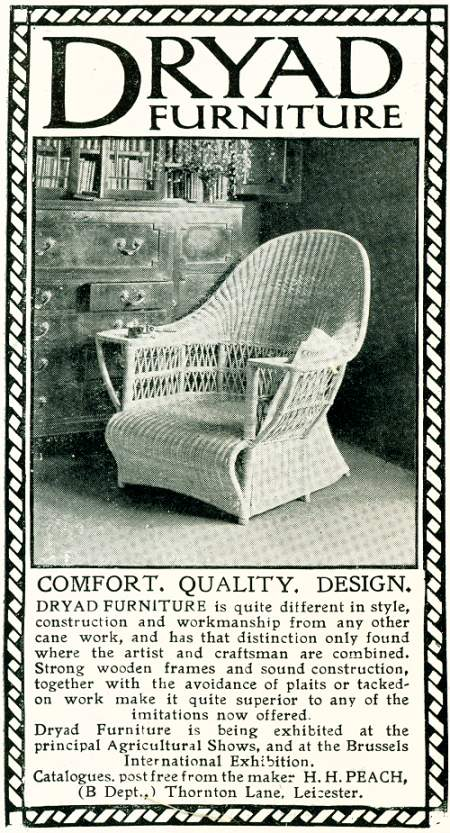
Dryad advertisement from 1910

After leaving school, Peach worked with his father for a short time as an estate agent before opening a specialist bookshop in Leicester dealing in manuscripts and early printed books.

By 1906, Peach's eyesight was failing and he gave up selling books. In 1907, he set up Dryad Furniture to manufacture cane furniture with his friend Benjamin Fletcher, who was head of the Leicester School of Art, as the main designer and a workforce of four. ( He had been asked by his father-in-law for a cane chair for his billiard room.) At the time the market was dominated by European manufacturers and Peach and Fletcher wanted to develop the local cane industry to compete and supply furniture suitable for the English market. Dryad supplied cane deck lounger chairs for White Star Lines ships, including the Titanic. By 1912, the company had expanded to a workforce of 50 and moved into larger premises, where he joined forces with designer William Pick to set up Dryad Metal Works, supplying architectural and household fittings manufactured in copper, brass and wrought iron. Fletcher had introduced Peach to the writings of William Morris and William Lethaby and other members of the Arts and Crafts movement, and many of the Dryad designs were in the arts and crafts style. By 1914, the companies employed nearly 200 staff.

During World War I, Peach began promoting craft work as a form of occupational therapy for wounded and disabled servicemen and donated large quantities of cane offcuts for this purpose. Identifying the growing demand for craft materials for domestic and educational purposes, Peach established Dryad Handicrafts to supply materials, instructional leaflets and designs and organise classes. By the time of his death, Dryad Handicrafts was the largest supplier of craft materials in the world.

Following his death, the Dryad companies were run by his elder and younger sons, Geoffrey and Roger Peach.

== Public campaigns ==
Peach and his first wife were involved in social reform and politics and were members of the Independent Labour Party. In 1906, to support Ramsay MacDonald's (successful) campaign to be elected as one of Leicester's members of parliament, Peach organised an exhibition on the poor industrial working conditions in the city. Marina Peach was also involved in the suffragette movement and campaigned for the improvement of health care for working class women.

In 1915, Peach was a founder member of the Design and Industries Association (DIA), whose first slogan was "Nothing Need Be Ugly". The DIA was set up to promote better relationships between manufacturers, designers and retailers and to "foster a more intelligent understanding amongst the public for what is best and soundest in design" and was inspired by the Deutscher Werkbund, set up in 1907 in an attempt to integrate traditional crafts and industrial mass-production techniques. In 1914 Harry visited its exhibition in Cologne.

Peach was also active in campaigns to preserve the countryside and prevent the uncontrolled expansion of towns and cities and unregulated advertising. He was secretary of the Leicestershire Footpath Association from 1912, and wrote its history in 1928.

He was also a long-term member of the Commons, Open Spaces and Footpaths Society and was the Honorary Secretary of the exhibitions committee for the Council for the Preservation of Rural England (now the Campaign to Protect Rural England), for which he organised many exhibitions and lectured all over England. In 1929 Harry persuaded the publicity manager of Shell-Mex to remove approximately 18,000 advertisements that were an eyesore in villages and open country. The DIA's 1930 yearbook jointly edited with Noel Carrington and titled The Face of the Land brought his proposals together.

== Legacy ==
Peach was involved in the founding of Leicester, Leicestershire and Rutland University College (which became Leicester University in 1957) and served on its board of governors for 15 years. The college was founded on Armistice Day 1918 as a living war memorial, with seven original private benefactors, which is unique. The first principal was appointed in May 1921, with the first (nine) students arriving in October. He was a major benefactor of the college and material he donated to the college, including some 1,600 books, forms part of the University Library's core special collection. The School of Law's library is named after him. After his death a memorial fund was raised which funds the biennial Harry Hardy Peach Lecture, organised by the Leicester Literary and Philosophical Society. (Note: Recent lectures have been given by Kenneth Grange, Christopher Frayling, Michael Wilford and Neil Cossons)

A collection of around 3,000 handicraft items, amassed by Peach from all round the world, was given in 1969 to Leicester Museum, where some are displayed in its World Arts Gallery .

Pat Kirkham (then a Senior Lecturer at Leicester Polytechnic) wrote a detailed biography, published in 1986 by The Design Council.
