= James Morton (chemist) =

Scottish pioneer of fast dyes and chemist

Sir James Morton FRSE LLD (1867–1943) was a Scottish pioneer of fast dyes.

== Life ==
He was born at Gowanbank in Darvel in Ayrshire on 23 March 1867 the second son of Alexander Morton (1844–1923) and his wife, Jane (Jeannie) Wiseman. His father founded the weaving company of Alexander Morton & Company, employing 600 persons in the late 19th century. He was educated at Darvel School then Ayr Academy. He did not go to university and was trained as a chemist at Morton Sundour Mills in Carlisle, when his family purchased Denton Mills in that city. The company greatly expanded the use of Arts and Crafts designs in the late 19th century. James specialised in permanent light-fast dyes and moved to Scottish Dyes Limited around 1895. He went on to direct the dyestuffs section of ICI. Morton aimed to make 'fast dyes' that would not fade in sunlight, even if that meant sacrificing the variety of colours available to the consumer. He sent out sample test cards of dyed fabric (sample in Science Museum Collections) to his brother-in-law, Patrick Fagan, who was working for the British colonial civil service in India, with instructions to leave the fabric exposed to direct sunlight for weeks and even months at a time.

In 1915 he commissioned Sir Robert Lorimer (who was also a major client and probable friend) to build new weaving sheds for Morton Sundour in Carlisle.

In 1929 he was the first recipient of the Faraday Centennial Medal in recognition of hs advances in making permanent fade-proof dyes.

In 1930 he was elected a Fellow of the Royal Society of Edinburgh. His proposers were Thomas James Jehu, Sir James Walker, James Pickering Kendall and Ralph Allan Sampson. St Andrews University awarded him an honorary doctorate (LLD) in the same year.

He was knighted in June 1936 by King George VI.

He died on 22 August 1943 at Dalston Hall near Carlisle.

== Family ==
In 1901 he married Beatrice Emily Fagan. They had two sons and four daughters.

== Legacy ==
The Science Museum, London has a collection of samples, notebooks, photographs and letters linked to James Morton.
