= Design and Industries Association =

British charity for promoting design

The Design and Industries Association (DIA) is a charity in the United Kingdom whose object is to engage with all those who share a common interest in the contribution that design can make to the delivery of goods and services that are sustainable and enhance the quality of life for communities and the individual.

== 20th century ==
Shortly before World War I there was a growing awareness, among British designers, of the extent to which German industrial design had taken the ideals of the Arts and Crafts movement (that had originated with William Morris and others in Britain in the late 19th century) and had successfully moved these into the age of mass, mechanised, production. The German Deutscher Werkbund organisation's Cologne exhibition, held before the outbreak of war in 1914, had been visited by many of those designers, architects, retailers and industrialists who were later to found the Design and Industries Association.

In March 1915 an exhibition of German manufactures was held at Goldsmiths' Hall in London. Shortly afterwards a meeting under the chairmanship of Lord Aberconway led to the foundation of the Design and Industries Association (DIA), with the express intention of raising the standard of British industrial design, under the slogan of "Fitness for Purpose".

DIA promoted its ideals through lectures, journals and exhibitions. Among its exhibitions were Household Things at the Whitechapel Gallery, London in 1920; the travelling exhibition Design Round The Clock from 1942 to 1945; and Register your Choice at Charing Cross Underground Station in 1953. Its journals over the period included Design In Industry (1932), Design for Today (1933–1935), and Trends in Everyday Life (1936).

In its early years there was considerable tension between the attachment of some members to the principles of the Arts and Crafts movement and the desire to promote the clearly 20th-century outlook of the Modern Movement.

Having been heavily involved with the British government's Utility Scheme in the Second World War, DIA had campaigned for the greater involvement of government in the promotion of good design. Ironically, DIA itself was to be somewhat eclipsed by the foundation of the government funded Council for Industrial Design, now the Design Council, in 1944.

== Today ==
Despite the predominance of the Design Council in the latter half of the 20th century, DIA continues its work today as an independent body, organising competitions, events and offering bursaries. In 1978 DIA, together with The Royal College of Art, The Faculty of Royal Designers for Industry and The Royal Academy of Engineering established the Sir Misha Black Awards to recognise excellence and innovation in design education.

== Membership ==
DIA office bearers and members have included some of the most notable 20th-century British designers and manufacturers:

- Lord Aberconway
- Wenman Joseph Bassett-Lowke
- Sir Misha Black
- Cecil Brewer
- Noel Carrington
- Serge Ivan Chermayeff
- Harold Curwen
- Nanna Ditzel
- Ambrose Heal
- Charles Holden
- Minnie McLeish
- Harry Peach
- Nikolaus Pevsner
- Frank Pick
- Jack Pritchard
- Sir (Sydney) Gordon Russell
- George Wilson-Crowe
- Sir Lawrence Weaver
- Hamilton T Smith, first director of Heals, designer
