= George Henry Walton =

Scottish architect (1867–1933)

George Henry Walton (1923) by Sir William Oliphant Hutchison

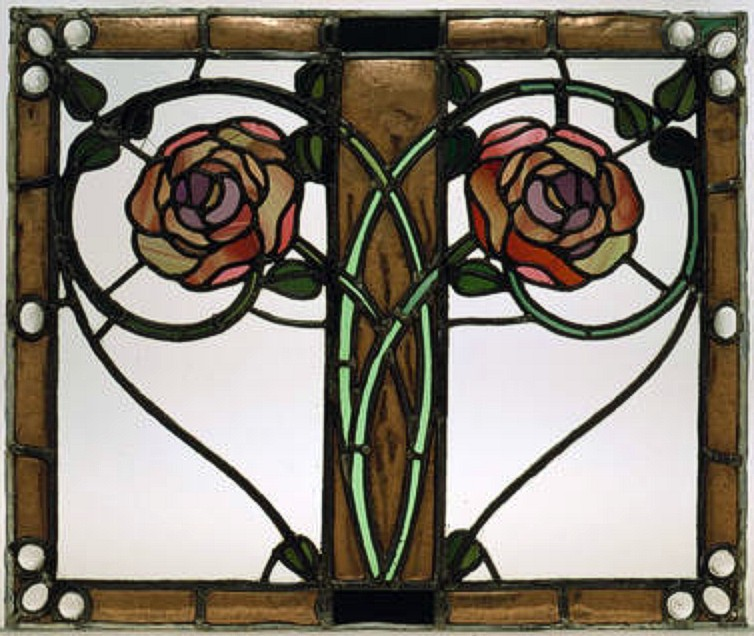
A copper and stained glass door panel designed by George Henry Walton for the luncheon room at Miss Cranston's Argyle Street Tea Rooms

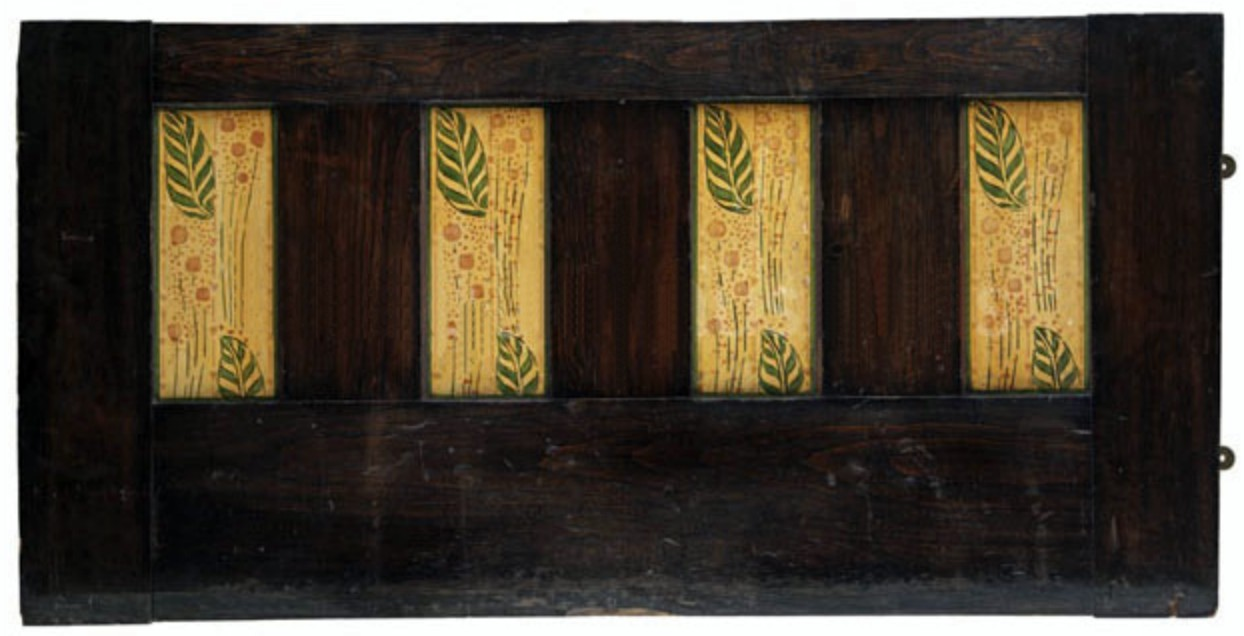
Painted panel by George Henry Walton used for Miss Cranston's Argyle Street Tea rooms

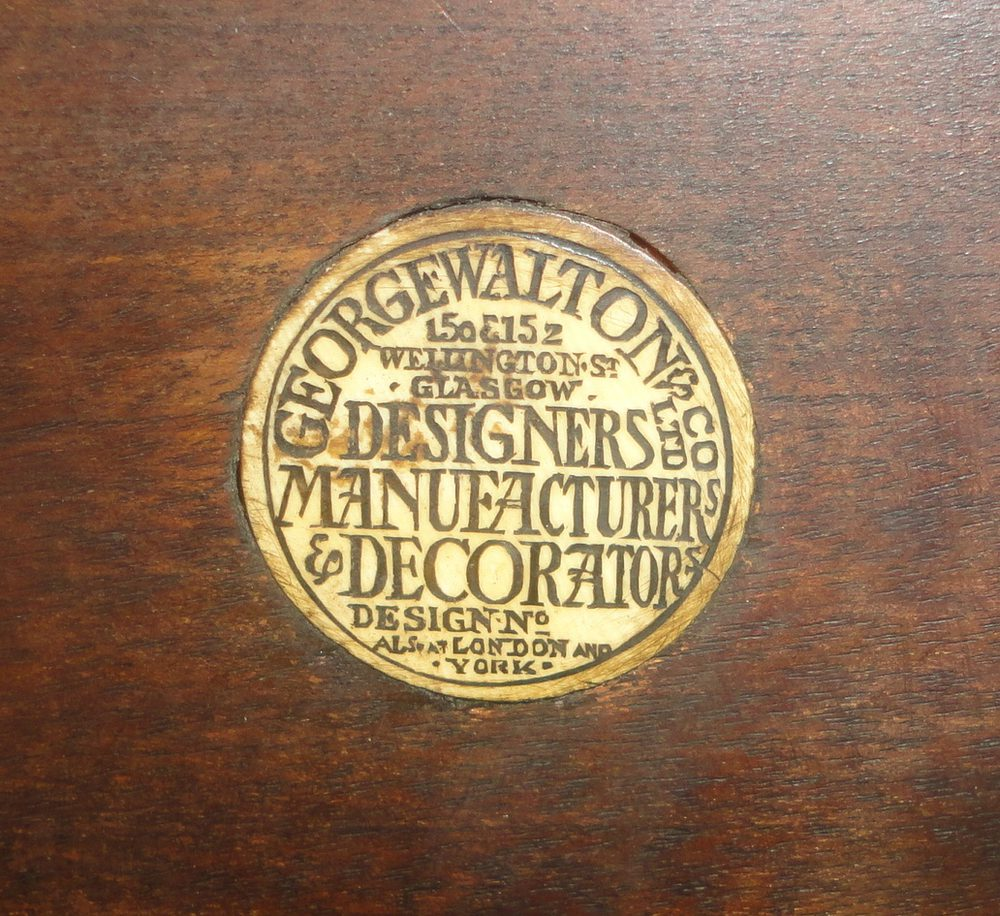
Button used by Walton on his furniture designs

George Henry Walton (3 June 1867 Glasgow – 10 December 1933 London), was a noted Scottish architect and designer of remarkable diversity.

== Biography ==
George Walton was born in Glasgow in 1862. He was the youngest of twelve talented children of Jackson Walton, a Manchester commission agent and himself an accomplished painter and photographer, by his second wife, the Aberdeen-born Quaker Eliza Ann Nicholson. George was a brother of the painter Edward Arthur Walton of the Glasgow School.

== Work in Glasgow and Scarborough ==
His father's death in 1873 left the family in straitened circumstances, and at the age of thirteen George started work as a clerk with the British Linen Bank. With a view to a different career, he attended art classes in the evenings at the Glasgow School of Art and with Peter McGregor Wilson (1856–1928) at the short-lived Glasgow Atelier of Fine Arts. When he was commissioned to redesign one of Miss Cranston's tea rooms at 114 Argyle Street in Glasgow, Walton started his own decorating company, George Walton & Co, Ecclesiastical and House Decorators, in 1888 at 152 Wellington Street. The peacock became the firm’s emblem. His arts and crafts style of decoration, including his woodblock printed wallpaper production, was influenced by William Morris and included stencilling, a common technique in Scotland at this time, and highly decorated wall surfaces in floral patterns, in line with prevailing fashion and also influenced by Japanese pattern books reflecting Glasgow’s then active trade with Japan. He was also greatly influenced by James Whistler

His work ventured into almost every avenue of decorative art, helping to pioneer the distinctive Glasgow Style. In 1890 he employed Robert Graham, the future manager of the company in 1903–05, and met the Quaker architect Fred Rowntree (1860–1927) at an amateur dramatic performance. On 3 June 1891 Walton married Kate Gall, a London girl from an affluent family, and moved into Charing Cross Mansions. Their daughter was born in 1892.

In the 1890s he was responsible for decorating St Peter’s Episcopal Church in Braid Street, Glasgow. The company became known for its stained glass, exhibiting at the Glasgow Institute in 1889 He was one of the pioneers in the use of domestic stained glass in Glasgow. In 1892 he worked on the house of the shipping magnate William Burrell and in 1893 he decorated ‘Drumalis’ the mansion owned by Sir Hugh Houston Smiley, 1st Baronet located in Larne, Northern Ireland and this remains his most complete extant company job.

Walton's firm rapidly diversified, winning commissions in woodwork, furniture making and stained glass. From 1896 Walton partnered with Fred Rowntree, in Rowntree family projects in their home town of Scarborough. In 1896, this led to his first commission in England for John Rowntree, who owned a cafe in the town. This project saw Walton’s first significant foray into furniture design, including the distinctive ‘Abingwood’ chair. Walton’s style by this stage was developing restrained ornament set off against plain surfaces.

In the same year he decorated and furnished Miss Cranston's Buchanan Street tea room, originally designed by George Washington Browne where Walton continued to develop his stencilling technique having abandoned wallpaper in favour of this more versatile technique. A review by Joseph Gleeson White commented on the elegant simplicity of Walton’s design despite the involvement of Washington Brown, whose work was considered heavy-handed. Walton also designed the furniture which was noted for its ‘sinuous verticality’ and accorded with the Glasgow Style aesthetic.

== Work in London and with photographers ==
In 1896 Walton converted his company into a limited joint-stock company with the majority of the shares held by Walton and most of the rest of the shares held by Rowntree and in 1897 Walton joined his brother Edward in London and set up house at 16 Westbourne Park Grove, Bayswater where he had a studio in the garden. He now styled himself as an artist in the Post Office Directory, instead of a painter and decorator.

In London his work came from personal connections with photographers. Through his friendship with the Glasgow photographer James Craig Annan, he designed a salon in the Dudley Gallery, Piccadilly, London. This commission involved placing pictures in groups and sub-groups in an irregular pattern with varying spaces between frames and rejected traditional practices of ‘skying and diving’ (which involved covering every available wall space). The Photography Annual declared this to be ‘the first time the geometrical, symmetrical, traditional manner had been completely abandoned’. In this exhibition he displayed only the highest quality pictures on a burnt sienna canvas.

In London he met George Davison (1854–1930) who was employed by Eastman Kodak. Through him Walton designed two rooms at the Eastman Exhibition which was critically acclaimed as ‘the biggest and best thing ever done’ in Britain by way of a photographic exhibition This led to a commission to design a new head office and showroom for Eastman’s European operations on Clerkenwell Road and later their new showroom at 171–3 Regent Street Walton went on to design up to three showroom designs for the company across Europe every year and each of them had Walton’s Glasgow flavour which made them distinct and novel. His commissions to design Kodak showrooms in the United Kingdom and Europe (London, Glasgow, Brussels, Milan, Vienna and Moscow) brought him international fame. He also designed the company's product packaging.

== Further work in Glasgow and Yorkshire ==
Walton worked on Ledcameroch, Bearsden near Glasgow for J B Gow, in 1897 where there was a lightness of touch reflecting his recent experience in exhibition design. In 1898 he worked on William Seaton’s tea room chain in Glasgow and in Yorkshire. A major commission from 1898 was the redecorating and furnishing of Elm Bank, York, for Sidney Leetham which included Japanese elements. Elm Bank is now a hotel and his work here reflected a new assurance in his approach.

His company opened a showroom in York's 21 Stonegate in 1898 and erected a four-storey block of workshops at 35–7 Buccleuch Street, in Glasgow in 1899 and 1900. From 1901 Walton undertook the construction of complete buildings, making use of experience from his association with Fred Rowntree. In 1901 Walton made the unusual step of becoming an architect, while many architects crossed over to interior design few moved in the other direction. His first commission was ‘The Leys’ for James Brooker Blakemoor Wellington (1858–1939) of Wellington & Ward Ltd, photographic materials manufacturers and previously of the Eastman company. The house is arts and crafts in style, large and unpretentious using vernacular materials and detailing with a triple-height hall containing one of his finest fireplace designs. The building has plain interiors and a simplicity of design reflecting a leaner and more sophisticated Walton His increasing reputation among photographers also led to more commissions for exhibitions.

== Increasing prosperity and focus on work in England ==
As Walton increased his activity and prosperity in 1901 he moved to a more fashionable address at 44 Holland Park Road in Holland Park. He resigned from George Walton & Co on 17 January 1903 and the York branch closed shortly afterwards and on 30 June 1905 the remaining partners wound up the company, which was based mainly in Glasgow. From then on Walton practised only as architect and designer. He continued to work on interiors, such as Alma House, Cheltenham and Finnart House, Weybridge, developing a more classical style.

== Work at Harlech ==
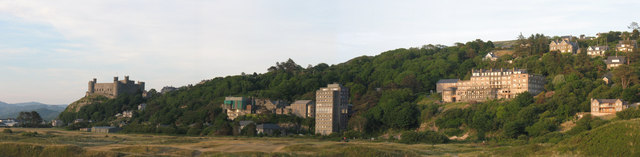
Photographic panorama showing Harlech Castle, Coleg Harlech and St David's Hotel, taken from the course of The Royal St David's Golf Club

In 1906 George Davison decided to build a house at Harlech where his school friend Harry More, Crown Agent for the Forestry Commission in Wales, lived. At this time Harlech had several English families whose social life revolved around Lord Winchelsea, whose brother established the St David's golf course in 1894. While developing his idea for a house he also proposed a hotel for golfers using the new golf course, on the recommendation of his English acquaintances in Harlech. By 1907 Walton completed his first designs for the hotel and the ‘Harlech Hotel and Land Development Syndicate Ltd’ was established. The hotel was known as the St David's Hotel.

Davison had expressed a desire for his own castle at Harlech and this defined the brief for the design of his house, which became known as Wern Fawr (now part of Coleg Harlech), a solid and heavy building built in the Georgian style, made of stone blocks and set on the edge of a cliff, mirroring Harlech Castle itself. Wern Fawr, built 1907–1908, reflected the developing vogue at this time for English Classicism.

== Admission as an architect and later life ==
Walton was admitted as Licentiate of the Royal Institute of British Architects on 20 July 1911, his proposer being his long-standing friend Charles Edward Mallows. From 1905 he had worked from an even grander home at 26 Emperor's Gate in Kensington, but following the outbreak of World War I, commissions were scarce. His wife Kate died and the generous financial support from the Gall family ceased. In 1916 Walton moved to Carlisle and between 1916 and 1921, working under Harry Redfern, he produced designs for pubs and canteens for the Central Control Board, established to manage the drinks trade and public houses in many munitions production areas.

Walton married a colleague, Dorothy (Daphne) Jeram, daughter of a Hampshire doctor on 20 November 1918, and a son was born in 1920. In 1919 Walton attempted to revive his private practice, with the support of various friends and the Scottish portrait-painter William Oliphant Hutchison (1889–1970), who had married his niece, and painted a striking portrait of Walton 10 years before his death. He now worked mainly as a textile designer for Morton Sundour Fabrics of Carlisle, but this work also ceased due to the recession and a falling-off in demand for Art Nouveau designs. In March 1931 the Waltons moved to 70 Seabrook Road in Hythe to cut down on living expenses.

A despondent Walton died on 10 December 1933. John Betjeman obtained a civil list pension for his widow. Walton's drawings and photographs relating to his later practice are in the British Architectural Library Collection.

== Bibliography ==
- George Walton: Designer and Architect – Karen Moon (White Cockade Publishing, 2001) ISBN 1-873487-01-0
