= St David's Hotel, Harlech =

Former hotel in Gwynedd, Wales

Coordinates: 52.8543°N 4.1135°W

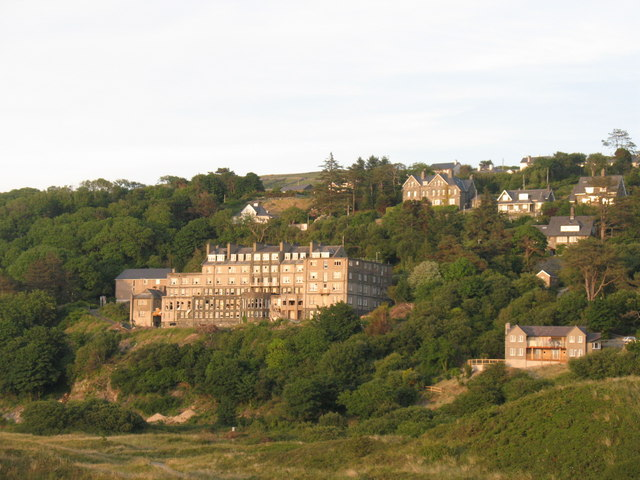
St David's Hotel, Harlech

St. David's Hotel was an Edwardian Era hotel in Harlech, Wales. The building was located on the A496, adjacent to Theatr Harlech (formerly called Theatr Ardudwy) on the campus of Coleg Harlech, and Royal St David's Golf Club.

== Design and construction ==
The St. David's Hotel is based on proposals drawn-up in January 1907 by George Henry Walton, a Glasgow School architect and contemporary of Charles Rennie Mackintosh. The proposals were subsequently revised in 1908, and the hotel was built in 1910.

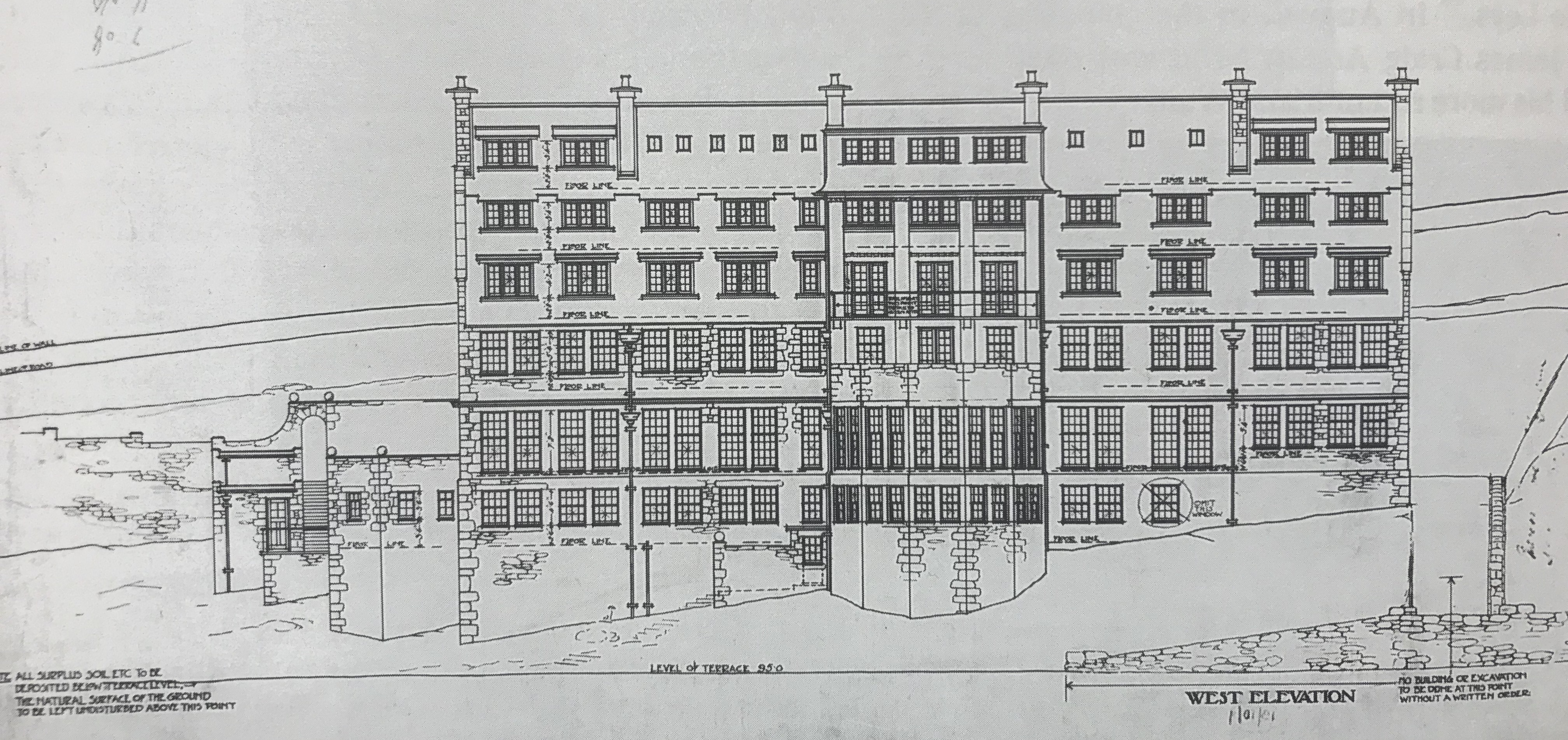
Architectural drawing by George Walton of St David's Hotel, Harlech dated 4 October 1908 from his studio at 26 Emperor's Gate, South Kensington, London

The Hotel has five storeys and a basement. The height of the Hotel was disguised by having the upper three floors included in a giant mansard with rows of dormers. The Hotel reflects skilled craftsmanship, in the handling of materials and detail, that echoes Walton's earlier design for Wern Fawr (now Coleg Harlech). Wern Fawr has been described as being "at the apex of building craft" and St David's Hotel has been described as Walton "at his most professional". At St David's Hotel, Walton provided solutions to a challenging commercial design brief that included the traditional use of heavy masonry on the exterior of the Hotel, which was intended to reflect the use of this material in the locality. In conjunction with this, Walton used reinforced concrete to open-up the interiors in order to simplify structural problems, make the most of the sea views, and give the interior "a cheerfulness which could survive even a dull Harlech day".

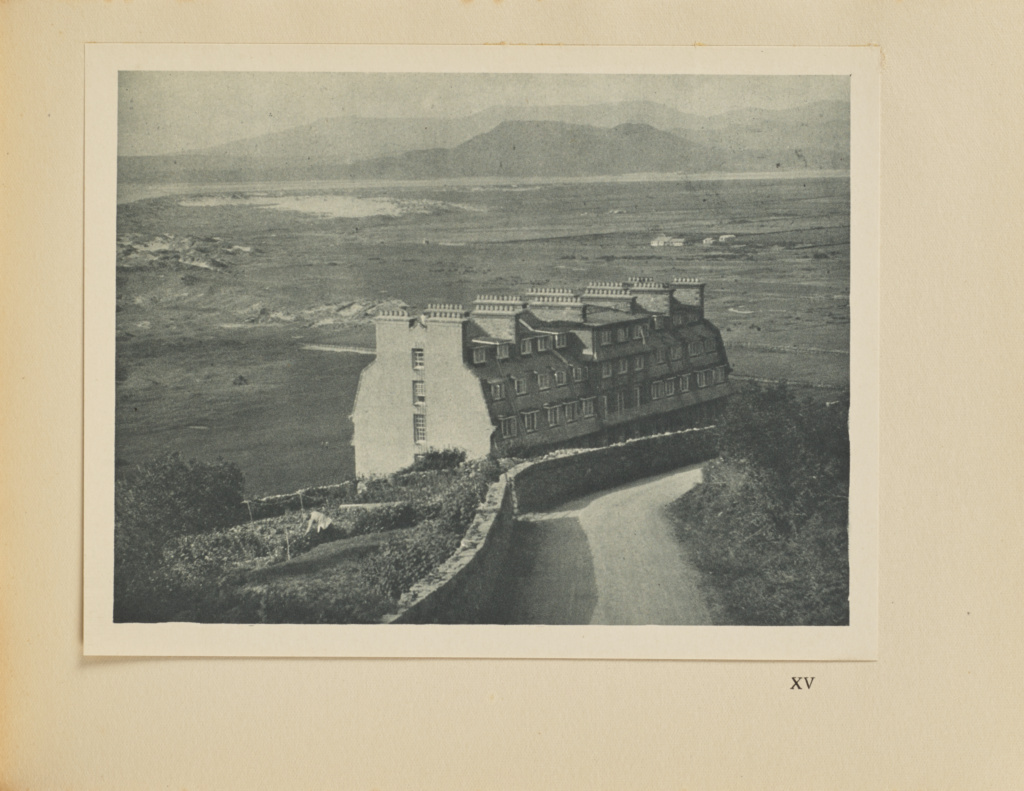
Mezzogravure by Alvin Langdon Coburn of St David's Hotel taken in 1920 and published in “The Book of Harlech”, a collection of his prints of the locality. Source: J. Paul Getty Museum

The Hotel sits on the edge of the Harlech Conservation Area. The exterior design responds to the character of the more traditional buildings nearby, because of its use of stone and traditional form. Walton also designed all the fixtures and fittings for the Hotel, including fitted furniture, carpets, tables, chairs, settees and ironmongery, working to a tight budget. Walton is one of the forerunners of later European architects, such as the Danish architect Arne Jacobsen, whose design brief for St Catherine's College, Oxford included all the interior fixtures and fittings.

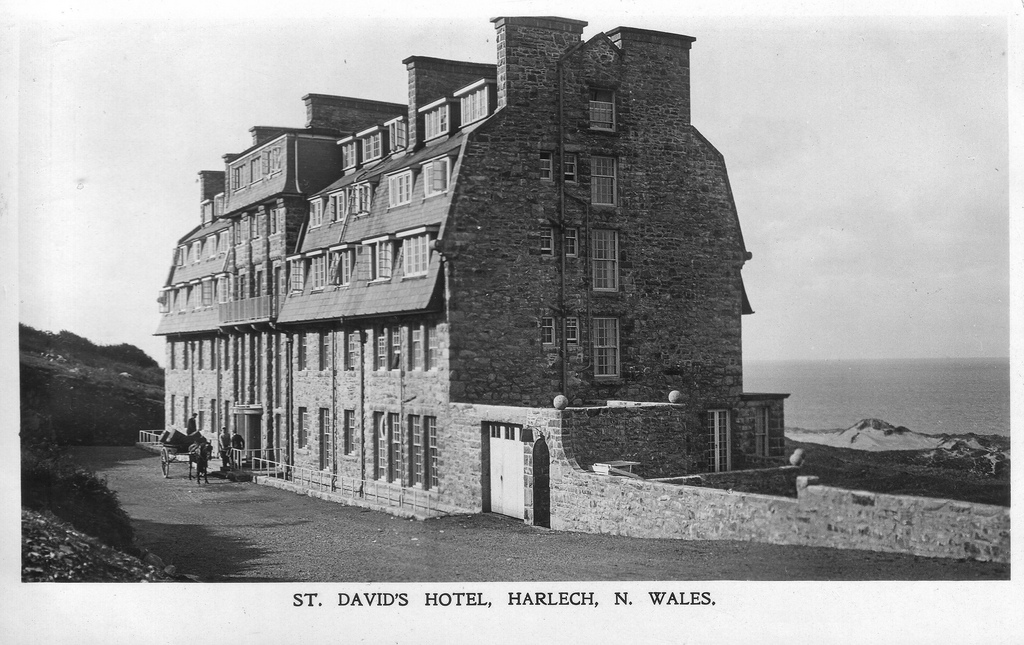
St David's Hotel, Harlech, photograph taken before 1922

The Hotel was built for a syndicate, in which George Walton was involved, and catered primarily for golfers visiting the adjacent Royal St David's Golf Club. The Hotel has been used by generations of golfers and other visitors to Harlech, who retain fond memories. The Hotel had 60 bedrooms and served traditional home-cooked food, facilities included an early twentieth-century lift (elevator), a snooker table, an outdoor pool, and a solarium.

== Fire ==
In 1922, a devastating fire destroyed the interior of the Hotel, so that Walton's original design commission has been lost. The Hotel was then rebuilt hurriedly by Griffith Morris. The three bay centre is now flanked by two storeys of stone, two of roughcast and the attic only is mansarded. The centre has also been altered on the top two floors and has a ground floor addition.

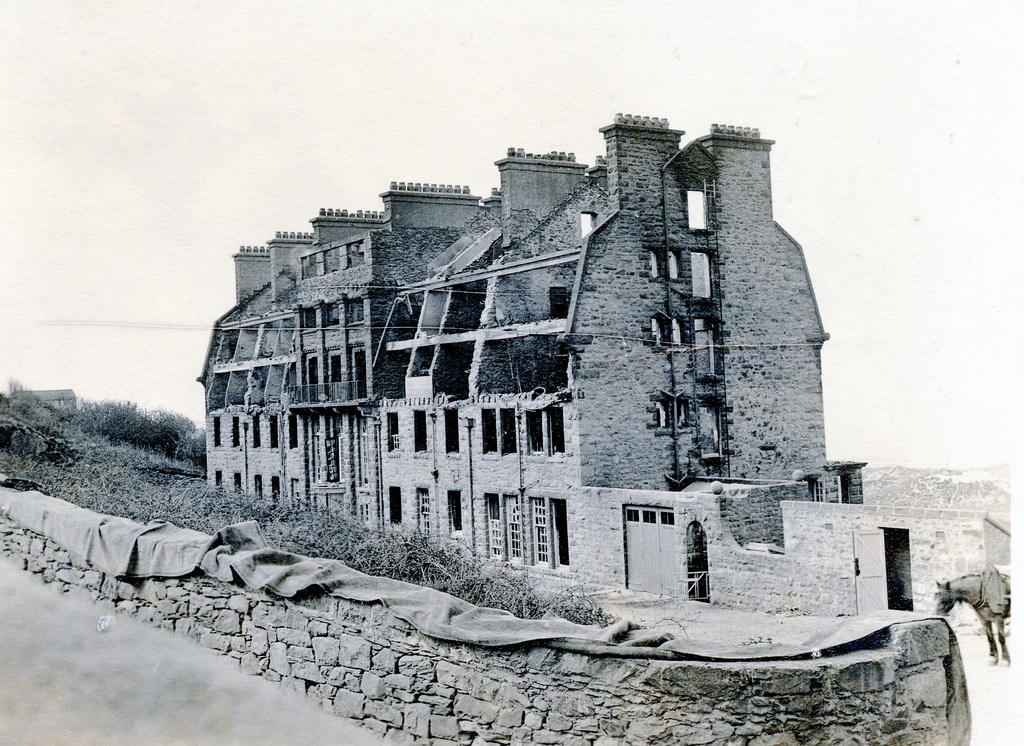
St David's Hotel, Harlech, after the fire in 1922. Source: Collection of Ken Wyn Jones M.B.E., Porthmadog

It is unclear from the records how much of the original interior structure has survived. The later, low quality, extensions have diminished the grand aspect of Walton's original structure. Despite this, the Hotel is retained in Cadw's listing description for Coleg Harlech, which is a Grade II* Listed Building, and this suggests that the Hotel was notable due to its group value.

== Demolition ==
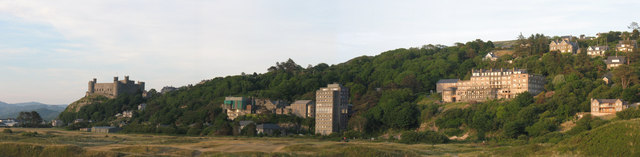
panorama showing Harlech Castle, Coleg Harlech, St David's Hotel taken from the course of The Royal St David's Golf Club

The Hotel closed in 2008 and became subject to planning application NP5/61/23L which was lodged with the Snowdonia National Park Authority (SNPA) for the following proposal: "Full application for demolition of hotel and [adjacent] college hall of residence and construction of a new 130 bedroom hotel and 76 holiday apartments, formation of new internal road layout, landscaping and associated engineering works." The proposals for the site were reviewed by the Design Commission for Wales (DCW) in October 2006 and subsequent comments were made in November 2006 and January 2007, in response to design revisions. On 17 December 2008, the DCW issued a Design Review Report which concluded, inter alia, that the replacement hotel complex would be an "overdevelopment of the site".

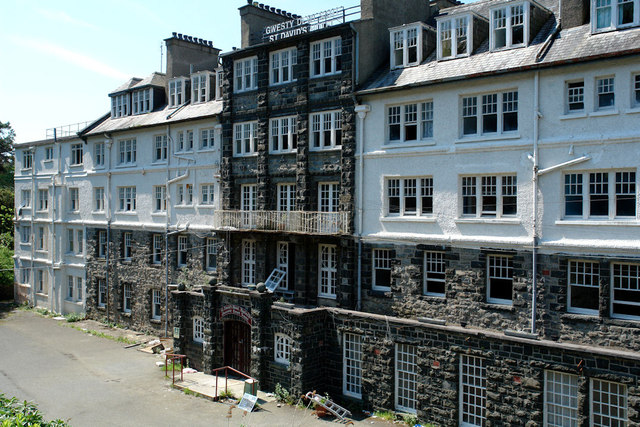
St David's Hotel, Harlech, 2008

Planning Application NP5/61/23L was heard, and approved, by the SNPA's Planning and Access Committee at a public meeting held at Plas Tan y Bwlch, Maentwrog on April 29, 2009. It was resolved to demolish the Hotel and that demolition was within the provisions of the Eryri Local Plan prepared by the SNPA under the provision of the Town and Country Planning Act 1990, and formally adopted by resolution of the National Park Committee up to 2003. The Design Review Report of the DCW notes that: "there has been very little community response" to the proposed demolition of the Hotel.

The hotel was finally demolished in October 2019, with the Welsh Government and Gwynedd Council contributing to the cost.

== Planning dispute ==
In December 2015 the SNPA filed an enforcement notice under section 215 of the Town and Country Planning Act 1990 (TCPA) requiring the owners, Aitchinson Associates Limited (AAL) of Gibraltar, to demolish the Hotel, which had remained closed since 2008 and had subsequently fallen into disrepair. AAL had until April 28, 2017 for the site to be cleared completely. However demolition work did not take place and AAL were taken to court by the SNPA due to a lack of action. The Magistrates' court (England and Wales) at Caernarfon fined AAL the maximum fine under Section 215 of the TCPA, in the amount of £1,000, together with a victim surcharge of £100, and awarded costs to the SNPA of £552.20. The SNPA noted the poor condition of the Hotel, with windows rotting, dormer windows completely perished, and sections of the roof collapsed. The SNPA also commented that it had been inundated with complaints from local residents and visitors to Harlech about the poor condition of the Hotel building, which lies in an elevated position adjacent to the A496 road.

On 17 October 2018, the SNPA's Planning and Access Committee considered exploring the possibility of initiating formal ‘direct action’ under Section 219 of the TCPA, in order to attempt to secure the demolition of the Hotel, due to the untidy condition of the building. In April, 2018 AAL were fined £20,900 and ordered to pay costs of £782 by Caernarfon Magistrates' court for failing to comply with the court order to demolish the Hotel.

The SNPA noted that demolition of the Hotel remains subject to securing funding, but in a press release they stated that they are keen to address other issues to help facilitate the demolition work, should funding become available. The SNPA pointed out that a key issue is the building of a structure within which the bats that currently live in the Hotel can be relocated, noting that all species of bats and their roosts are protected under the Wildlife and Countryside Act 1981. With the permission of AAL a contractor was commissioned to construct a small bat barn on the site during the first quarter of 2019.

== Legacy ==
The Hotel formed an important part of Harlech's Arts and Crafts movement legacy.
