= Minnie McLeish =

British textile designer

Minnie McLeish (1876–1957), was a British textile designer.

McLeish worked with Charles Rennie Mackintosh and Constance Irving for William Foxton Ltd in London and the Metz store in Amsterdam. She was "prolific", and designed fabrics for Morton Sundour.

Her work is in the permanent collection of the Victoria and Albert Museum, London.
