= Lindsay Butterfield =

British textile and wallpaper designer

Lindsay Phillip Butterfield (1869–1948) was a British textile and wallpaper designer. His work is in the permanent collection of the Victoria and Albert Museum, London. According to the V&A, he was "one of the most successful freelance designers of patterns who worked in the Arts and Crafts style." In 1930, he was a founding member of the Society of Industrial Designers, now known as the Chartered Society of Designers.

Butterfield trained at Lambeth School of Art in 1887 to 1888, then briefly studied architecture under his cousin Philip Johnstone, before spending three years at the National Art Training School in South Kensington, London.

His uncle was the London church architect William Butterfield (1814-1900), and his godfather was John Belcher, also an architect.

In 1922, he published Floral forms in historic design for B. T. Batsford Ltd.
