= List of listed buildings in Airth, Falkirk =

This is a list of listed buildings in the parish of Airth in Falkirk council area, Scotland.

== List ==
Name	Location	Date Listed	Grid Ref. (Note: Sometimes known as OSGB36, the grid reference (where provided) is based on the British national grid reference system used by the Ordnance Survey. • "Guide to National Grid". Ordnance Survey. • "Get-a-map". Ordnance Survey.)	Geo-coordinates	Notes	LB Number (Note: Historic Environment Scotland assign a unique alphanumeric identifier to each designated site in Scotland, for listed buildings this always begins with "LB", for example "LB12345".)	Image
Dunmore Village, Four Dwellings Dated 1854				56°05′05″N 3°46′45″W	Category B	4264	Upload Photo
Strath-Earn (3 Dwellings) Dunmore Village				56°05′08″N 3°46′47″W	Category B	2089	Upload Photo
Lodge, Dunmore Park (East Lodge)				56°04′21″N 3°46′45″W	Category B	2113	Upload Photo
Dunmore Park				56°04′57″N 3°47′36″W	Category B	2093	Upload another image See more images
Ruined Church Near Castle				56°03′43″N 3°46′03″W	Category A	2094	Upload Photo
Elphinstone Inn				56°04′05″N 3°46′11″W	Category C(S)	2097	Upload Photo
Old Cross, Airth Castle				56°03′50″N 3°46′12″W	Category C(S)	2105	Upload Photo
Dunmore Stables And Dovecot				56°04′53″N 3°47′45″W	Category B	2110	Upload another image See more images
Forth View And Viewfield, Dated 1840 Dunmore Village				56°05′04″N 3°46′47″W	Category B	2116	Upload Photo
Logan Lea (No 18 Shore Road)				56°04′09″N 3°46′11″W	Category B	2100	Upload Photo
The Parsonage, Dunmore				56°04′37″N 3°46′52″W	Category B	2112	Upload Photo
North Church, Airth				56°04′10″N 3°46′21″W	Category B	2087	Upload Photo
5 Dwellings Dunmore Village				56°05′06″N 3°46′48″W	Category B	2088	Upload Photo
Powfowlis, Stables And Dovecot				56°03′07″N 3°44′17″W	Category B	2092	Upload Photo
School House, (Rosebank)				56°04′07″N 3°46′17″W	Category B	2098	Upload Photo
Stables, Airth Castle				56°03′43″N 3°46′13″W	Category B	2104	Upload Photo
Garden Wall And Pineapple, Dunmore Park				56°04′36″N 3°47′12″W	Category A	2109	Upload another image See more images
Captain's House (No 44 Paul Drive)				56°04′12″N 3°46′08″W	Category B	159	Upload Photo
The Smithy And Bankside Dunmore Village				56°05′08″N 3°46′43″W	Category B	160	Upload Photo
Club's Tomb Linkfield				56°04′00″N 3°47′56″W	Category C(S)	2090	Upload Photo
Powfowlis (Manor Hotel)				56°03′05″N 3°44′20″W	Category B	2091	Upload Photo
Airth Mercat Cross				56°04′05″N 3°46′12″W	Category A	2095	Upload another image See more images
Airth Castle				56°03′42″N 3°46′05″W	Category A	2102	Upload another image See more images
Sundial, Airth Castle				56°03′41″N 3°46′05″W	Category B	2103	Upload Photo
Ivy Cottages (2 Dwellings), Dunmore Village				56°05′06″N 3°46′44″W	Category B	2114	Upload Photo
View Villa				56°04′05″N 3°46′12″W	Category B	2096	Upload Photo
House In Shore Road (No 16 Shore Road)				56°04′09″N 3°46′11″W	Category B	2099	Upload Photo
Rothesay Villa				56°04′11″N 3°46′10″W	Category C(S)	2101	Upload Photo
Gateway Airth Castle				56°03′46″N 3°45′54″W	Category B	2106	Upload Photo
Kersie Mains				56°05′58″N 3°48′55″W	Category B	2107	Upload Photo
Elphinstone Tower, Dunmore Park				56°04′49″N 3°47′05″W	Category C(S)	2111	Upload another image See more images
Rose Cottages, Dunmore Village (2 Dwellings)				56°05′04″N 3°46′45″W	Category B	2115	Upload Photo
South Kersie				56°05′38″N 3°48′46″W	Category C(S)	2108	Upload Photo
Dunmore Village, Pump				56°05′06″N 3°46′46″W	Category B	51682	Upload Photo

== Key ==
The scheme for classifying buildings in Scotland is:

- Category A: "buildings of national or international importance, either architectural or historic; or fine, little-altered examples of some particular period, style or building type."
- Category B: "buildings of regional or more than local importance; or major examples of some particular period, style or building type, which may have been altered."
- Category C: "buildings of local importance; lesser examples of any period, style, or building type, as originally constructed or moderately altered; and simple traditional buildings which group well with other listed buildings."

In March 2016 there were 47,288 listed buildings in Scotland. Of these, 8% were Category A, and 50% were Category B, with the remaining 42% being Category C.

== See also ==
- List of listed buildings in Falkirk (council area)
