= John Wilson (Scottish architect) =

Scottish architect (1877–1959)

John Wilson OBE FRSE FRIBA FISA (1877–1959) was a 20th-century Scottish architect who influenced the design of state-subsidised local authority housing in Scotland after 1917 and as Chief Architect advised the Scottish Department of Health on hospital design.

Much of his work is wrongly attributed to his employers: George Washington Browne and John More Dick Peddie resulting in his being either ignored or under-rated. This factor is not helped by the commonality of his name.

== Professional life ==
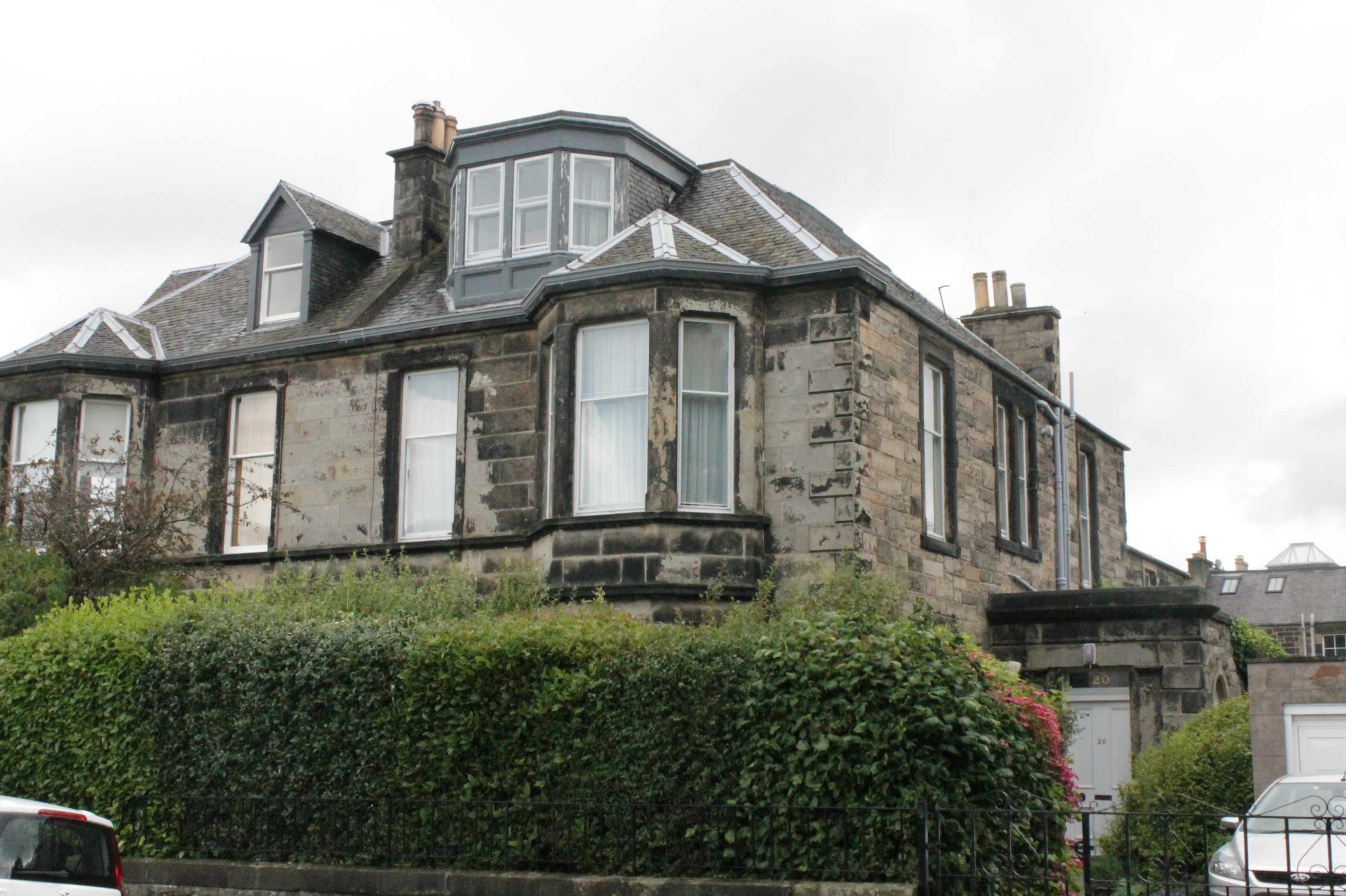
20 Lomond Road, Edinburgh

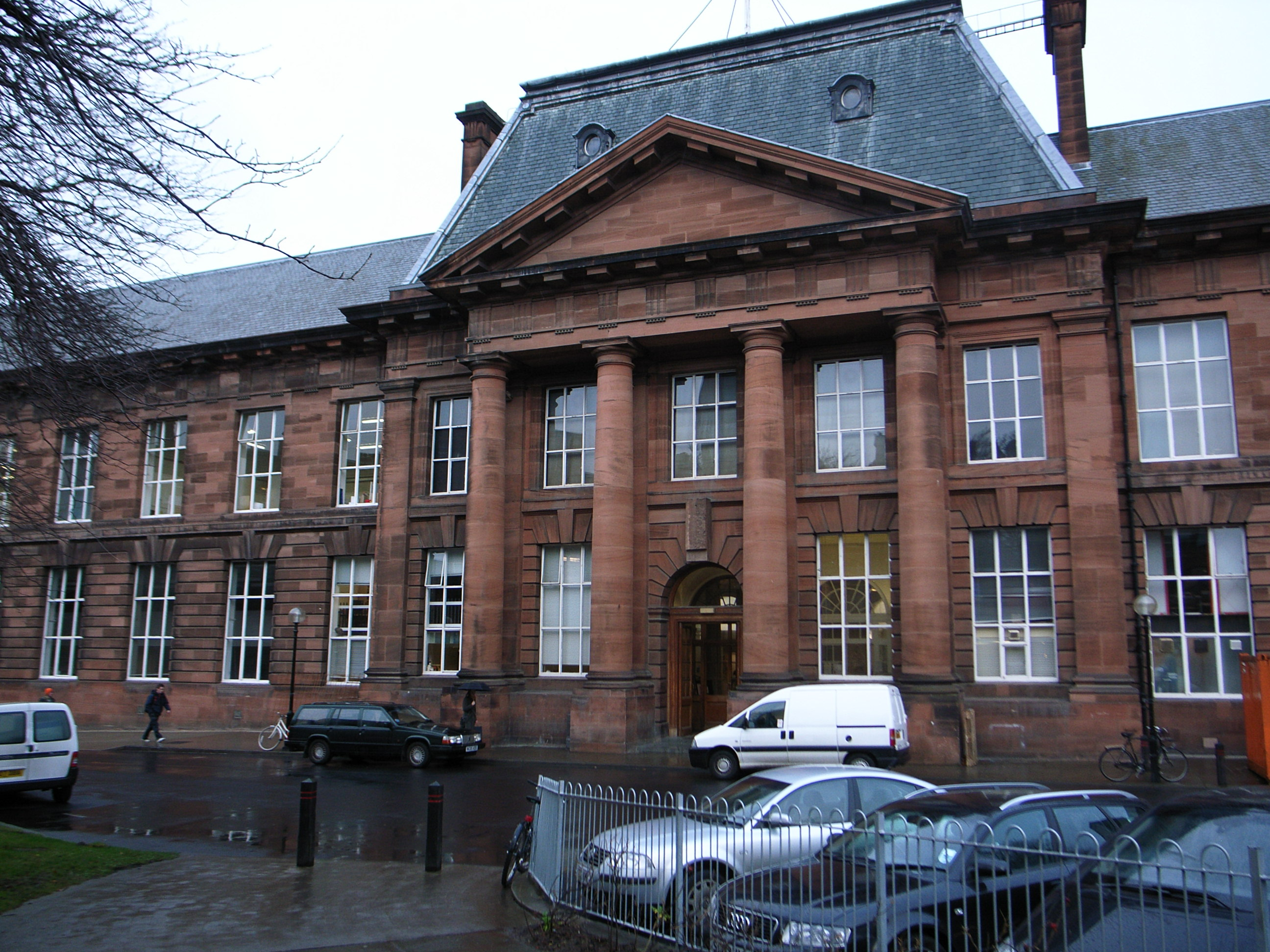
Edinburgh College of Art

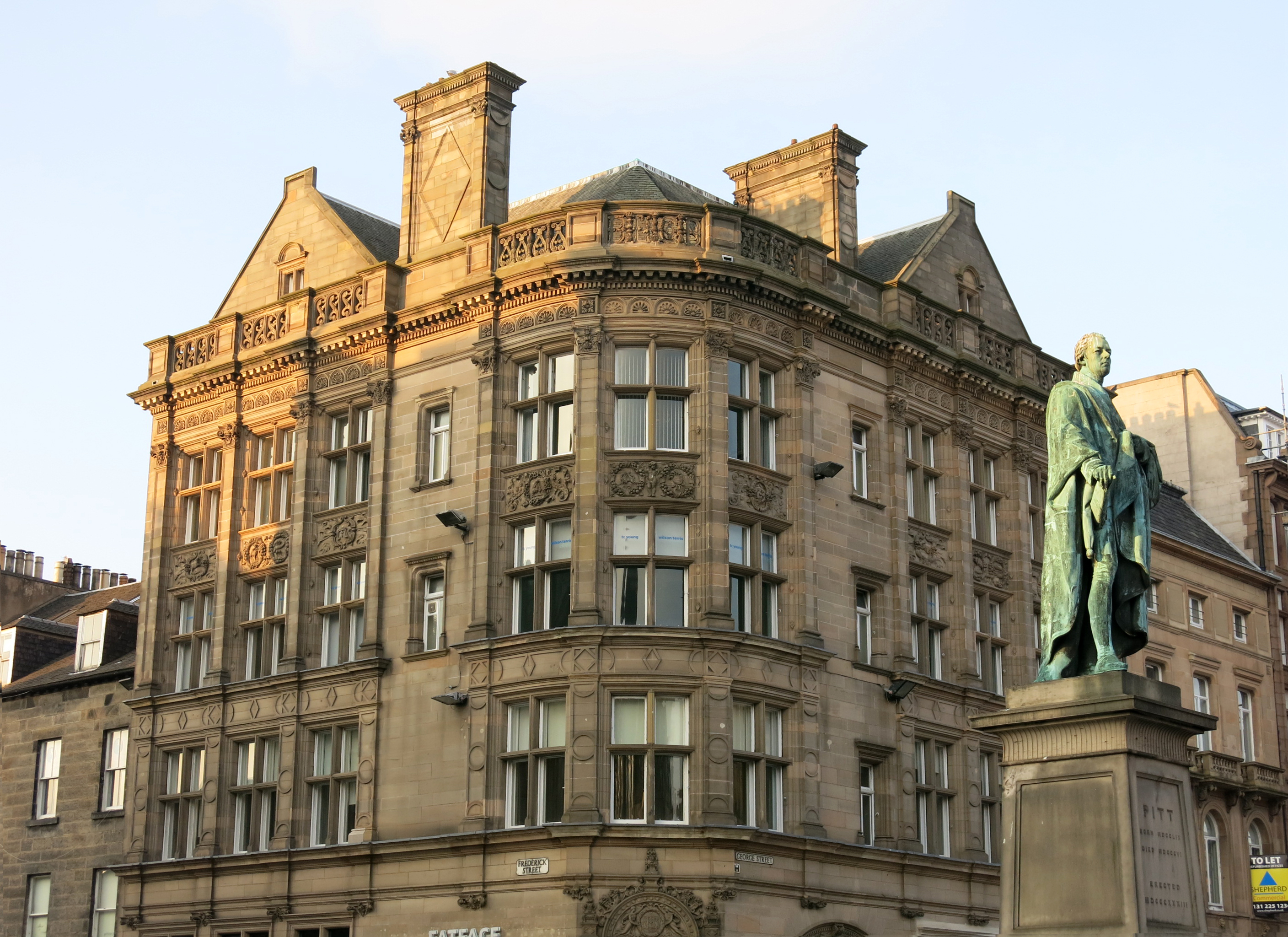
British Linen Bank, Edinburgh - 69 George Street

He was born in Edinburgh on 27 March 1877. He was either the son or nephew of Robert Wilson and grandson of Patrick Wilson, both architects. From 1892 he was apprenticed in Robert's office. He also studied at the Edinburgh School of Applied Arts under Frank Worthington Simon and Stewart Henbest Capper, from whom he acquired a great love and skill in Arts and Crafts and Beaux Arts design. He graduated in 1899 and won a travelling scholarship with which he spent five months travelling, sketching and doing measured drawings in England.

From 1900 he worked for Peddie and Washington Browne, rapidly rising to be their Chief Assistant by 1903. He set up his own practice in 1904 but received frequent commissions from Browne and Peddie, who greatly valued his work. In 1905/6 he undertook a second travelling scholarship with James Anderson Arnot. During this he undertook a comprehensive measured survey of the Petit Trianon at Versailles.

From 1905 he was a lecturer at the Edinburgh College of Art and appears highly linked to their replacement building of 1907, which displays much of his knowledge of French detailing.

In 1910 Wilson gave up both his own practice and his commissions from Peddie to work as a government architect based at 125 George St in Edinburgh. He was an architectural inspector for the Local Government Board for Scotland prior to and during the First World War.

In 1913 he was elected a Fellow of the Royal Institute of British Architects. His proposers were Alexander Lorne Campbell, Robert Lorimer and Robert Rowand Anderson.

In 1917, the Sir Henry Ballantyne chaired Royal Commission on Housing in Scotland published a report by Wilson, on the design, construction and materials of small dwelling houses, with specifications and plans. It was published as a separate official document to assist Local Authorities preparing post-war housing schemes. Thus Wilson was an important influence on the plans submitted to the Local Government Board for Scotland, and later the Scottish Board of Health, in terms of the Housing and Town Planning (Scotland) Act 1919, for early state-subsidised council housing. The designs are similar to those produced for the Local Government Board in England by Raymond Unwin. The local authority schemes took the form of "garden suburbs" for the working classes.

In 1921 Wilson was placed on the committee investigating the High Cost of Building Works in Working Class Dwellings in Scotland, and in 1925 sat on the Moir Committee on construction costs.

In 1922 he was elected a Fellow of the Royal Society of Edinburgh. His proposers were Arthur Pillans Laurie, Sir John James Burnet, Sir William Leslie Mackenzie and Thomas Hudson Beare.

In 1929 he was appointed Chief Architect to the Department of Health for Scotland by the Secretary of State for Scotland. His principal achievement in this period was the programming and creation of the Simpson Memorial Maternity Hospital attaching the Edinburgh Royal Infirmary on Lauriston Place (opened in 1939).

In 1934 he worked with Sir Godfrey Collins (the Scottish Secretary of State), John Highton (the Permanent Under Secretary), Dr W G Clark (Medical Officer of Health for Glasgow) and Ebenezer MacRae (City Architect for Edinburgh) on an extensive study of European social housing. This resulted in a set of standards both for space and for minimum aspirations for aesthetics and open space. These standards were used for a number of successful schemes but unfortunately the Second World War brought an end to the building programme. From 1936 he was assisted by the architect Robert Hogg Matthew.

He was created OBE in 1941. In 1942 Wilson retired and replaced in his role as Chief Architect by Robert Matthew.

== Publications ==
- Special report on the design, construction and materials of various types of small dwelling-houses in Scotland (British Parliamentary Paper, 1917)
- The Planning of Sanitoria Hospitals and Other Public Health Institutions
- Hospital Planning and Construction
- Town Planning in Relation to Public Health

== Architectural works ==
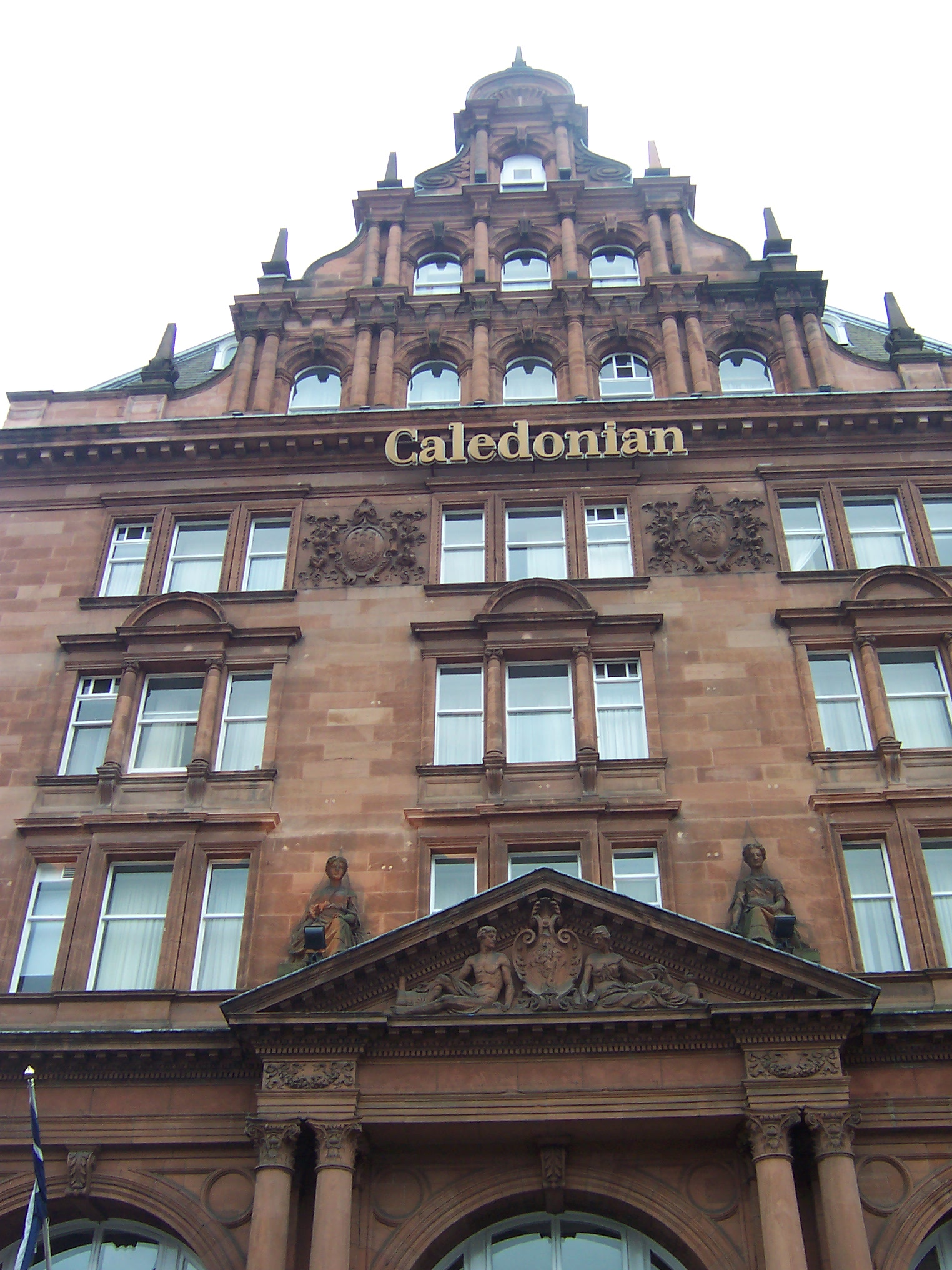
Caledonian Hotel, Edinburgh

- Caledonian Hotel, Edinburgh (1898 - as assistant to Peddie)
- North British and Mercantile Company offices, Dublin (1902 - as assistant to Browne & Peddie)
- Scottish Provident Assurance Office, Glasgow (1903 - as senior assistant to Browne & Peddie)
- British Linen Bank corner of Frederick Street and George Street, Edinburgh
- Inglewood, Morningside, Edinburgh (1905)
- Torwood, Peebles (1905)
- Edinburgh Art College (1906 - for Browne & Peddie)
- Edinburgh Life Assurance offices, corner of Hanover Street and George Street, Edinburgh (1907 with Peddie)
- Melrose Parish Church (1909 - for Peddie)
- County Hospital for Infectious Diseases, Inverness (1914)

== Personal and family life ==
John Wilson married Evelyn Ruth Jackson on 8 June 1910 in Evian, France. Evelyn was born in Paris on 9 February 1894, the second daughter of Joseph Jackson and Catherine Adey Pratt. Joseph Jackson was the founder and owner of Royal Windsor, which made hair oil, based in Paris. Evelyn died in 1969. Her diaries were left to the Institut Francais d'Ecosse in Edinburgh.

From 1911 he lived at 76 Thirlestane Road, a flat in the Marchmont district, but moved the following year to 59 Murrayfield Gardens.

Wilson went blind in 1942 and necessarily retired. He died at 20 Lomond Road in Trinity in north Edinburgh on 20 January 1959.

John and Evelyn had two children. Kenneth Evelyn Adey Wilson, a lieutenant in the Royal Engineers, was killed in Egypt on 24 December 1942. He is buried in El Alamein War Cemetery. Janet Wilson, a graduate, worked for the Scottish Council. She died in the 1980s. (further research needed) Family archive.
