= Midhope Castle =

Castle in West Lothian, Scotland

- Abercorn, West Lothian, Scotland; UK grid reference NT072786
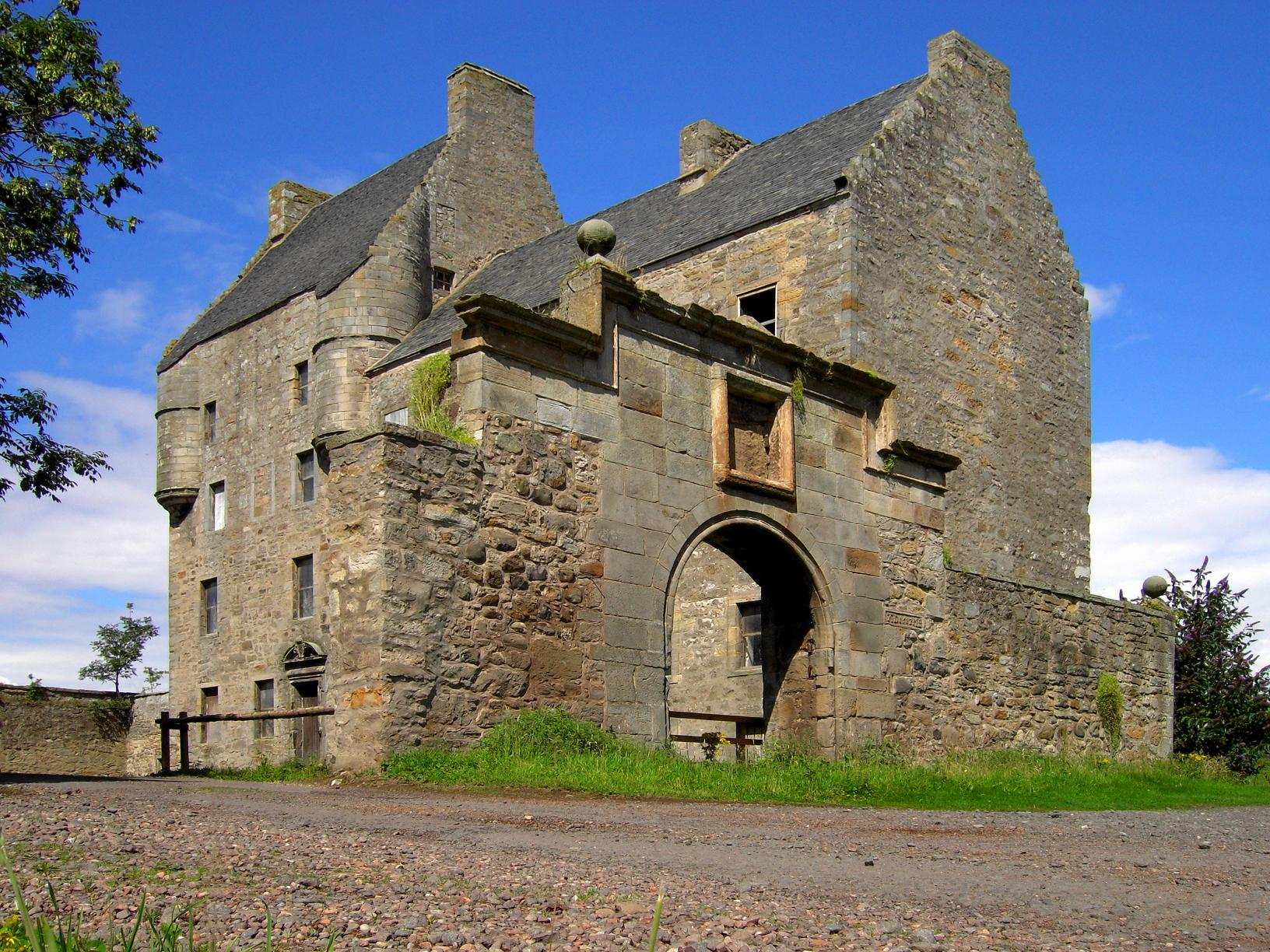
- Front of Midhope Castle

Site information
- Type: Tower house
- Owner: Hopetoun Estate
- Controlled by: Hopetoun Estate
- Open to the public: With permission. Exterior only
- Condition: Ruined

Location
- Location within Scotland
- Coordinates: 55°59′31″N 3°29′15″W

Site history
- Built: late 16th century
- Materials: Stone

Midhope Castle is a late 16th-century tower house in Scotland. It is situated in the hamlet of Abercorn on the Hopetoun estate, About 4 kilometres (2.5 mi) to the west of South Queensferry, on the outskirts of Edinburgh. It is a Category A listed building.

== History ==
The derelict chateau that can be seen today represents the much-altered 5-storey, oblong tower house.

In the 14th century the lands of Midhope were owned by Henry Graham of Mannerstoun. When he died without leaving a male heir Midhope passed to his two daughters. One of the daughters married Robert Livingstone of Drumry and Mannerstoun. The other daughter, Christian, married John Martin of Midhope, with Martin holding Midhope from the Livingstones of Drumry.

In the 15th century Midhope belonged to the Martin family. In 1438, John Martin of Midhope was the laird, and he is thought to have built the original tower house. John Martin's widow, Lady Christian Martin, retained the right to occupy Midhope according to contract she signed with James Livingston of Mannerston.

In 1537 Sir James Hamilton of Finnart received a grant of half the lands of Midhope, half the lands of Mannerstoun and half of the mill of Abercorne from Elizabeth Martin, Lady of Falscastell, who held the lands from John Lindsay, 5th Lord Lindsay of the Byres.

During the latter 16th century, the castle belonged to Alexander Drummond of Midhope, brother to Robert Drummond of Carnock, Master of Work to the Crown of Scotland. A stone inscribed "AD 1582 MB" commemorates Alexander and his wife Marjory Bruce, daughter of Robert Bruce of Airth.

Alexander Drummond was a servant of the Earl of Huntly, who regarded him as a cousin. On 7 August 1573, on behalf of the Earl of Huntly, Drummond returned jewels belonging to Mary, Queen of Scots to Regent Morton at Holyrood Palace. Drummond was buried at Airth Old Kirk.

A painted ceiling from the tower survives in the care of Historic Scotland at Edinburgh. It includes cinquefoil motifs and probably commemorates the marriage of Sir Robert Drummond, who became laird in 1619, to a Hamilton heiress. The family motto was "ad astra per ardua" and fragments from another painted ceiling had gold stars on a blue blackground, represented in the crest of the coat of arms.

In 1678, Midhope was given a facelift when an entrance tower was removed and the extension to the east was heightened and extended. A new doorway was added along with a small courtyard, measuring 114 by 61 feet (35 by 19 m), to the south.

A large, two-chambered, oblong, late 17th century dovecot sits about 140 metres (150 yd) to the southeast.

== In popular culture ==
Midhope Castle is featured as a location in the Outlander TV series on Starz as the main character's, Jamie Fraser, family home called Lallybroch but also known as Broch Tuarach.

== Gallery ==
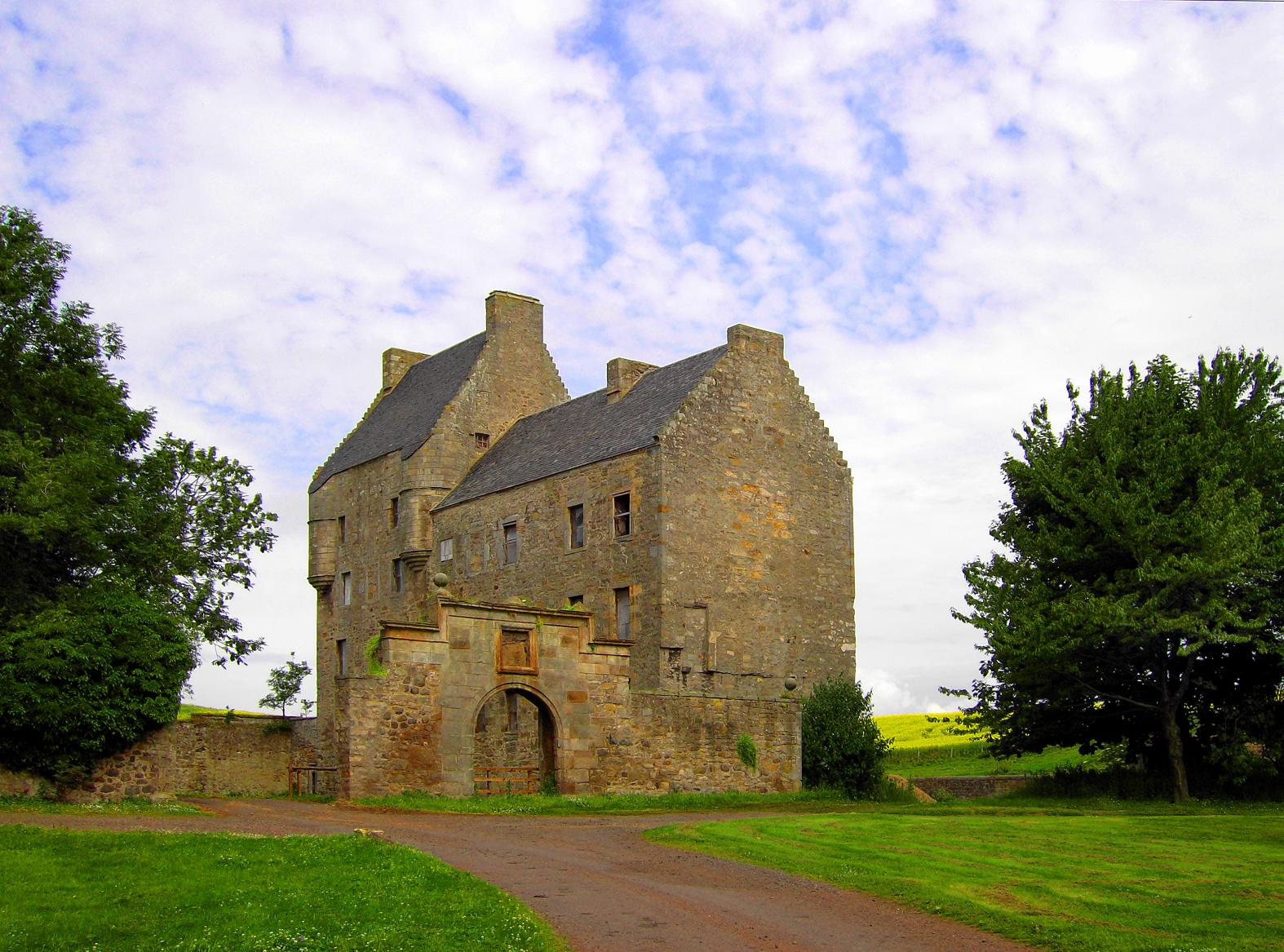
The castle from the east.

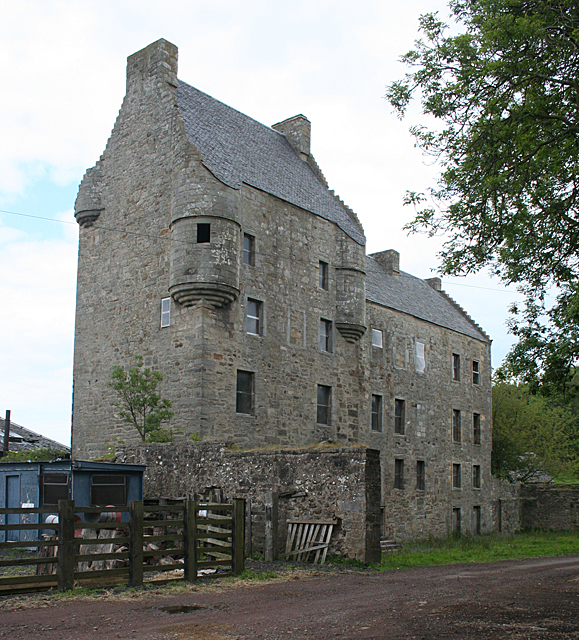
Courtyard view of castle

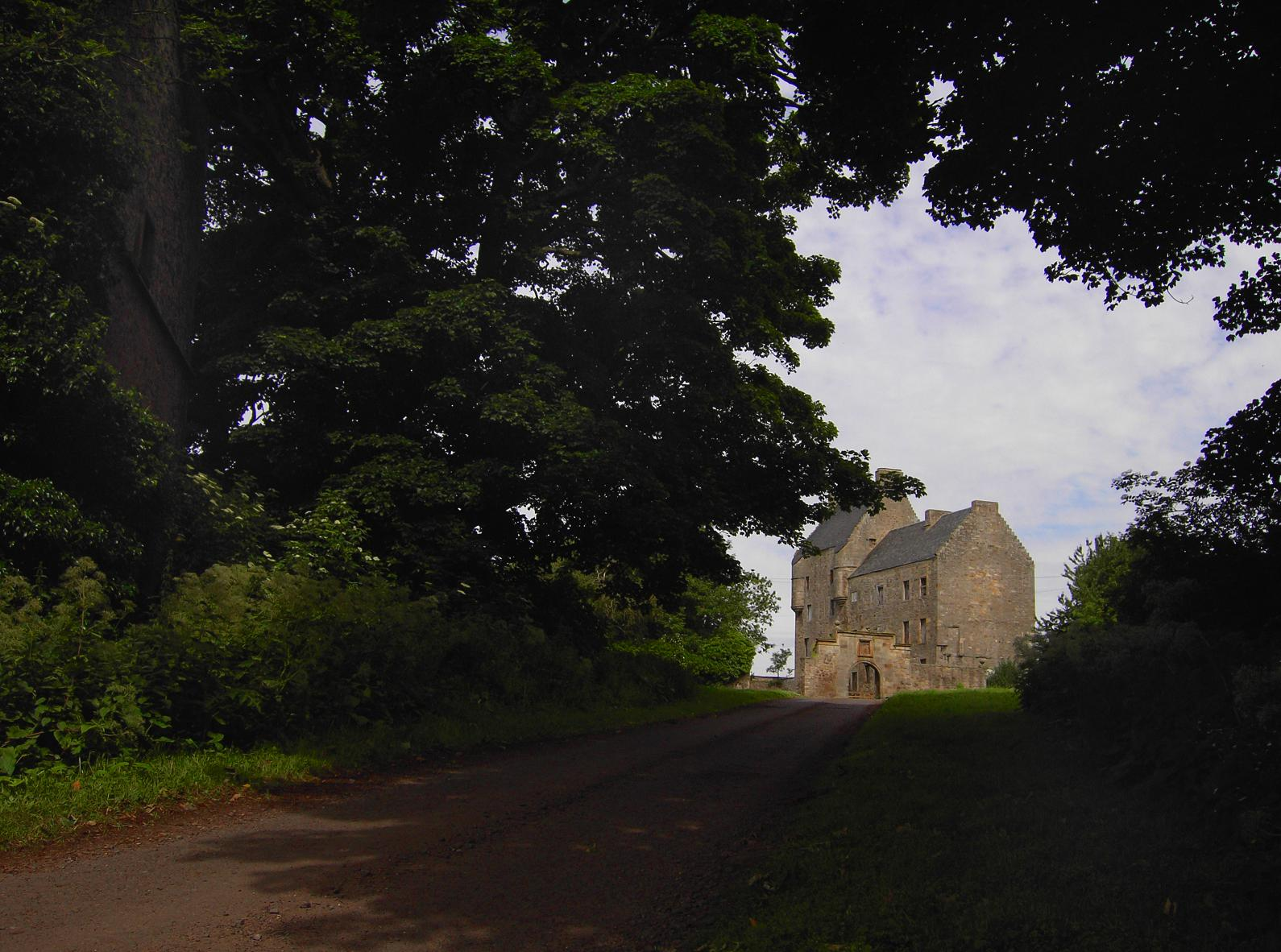
Approach to the Castle with Dovecot to the left.

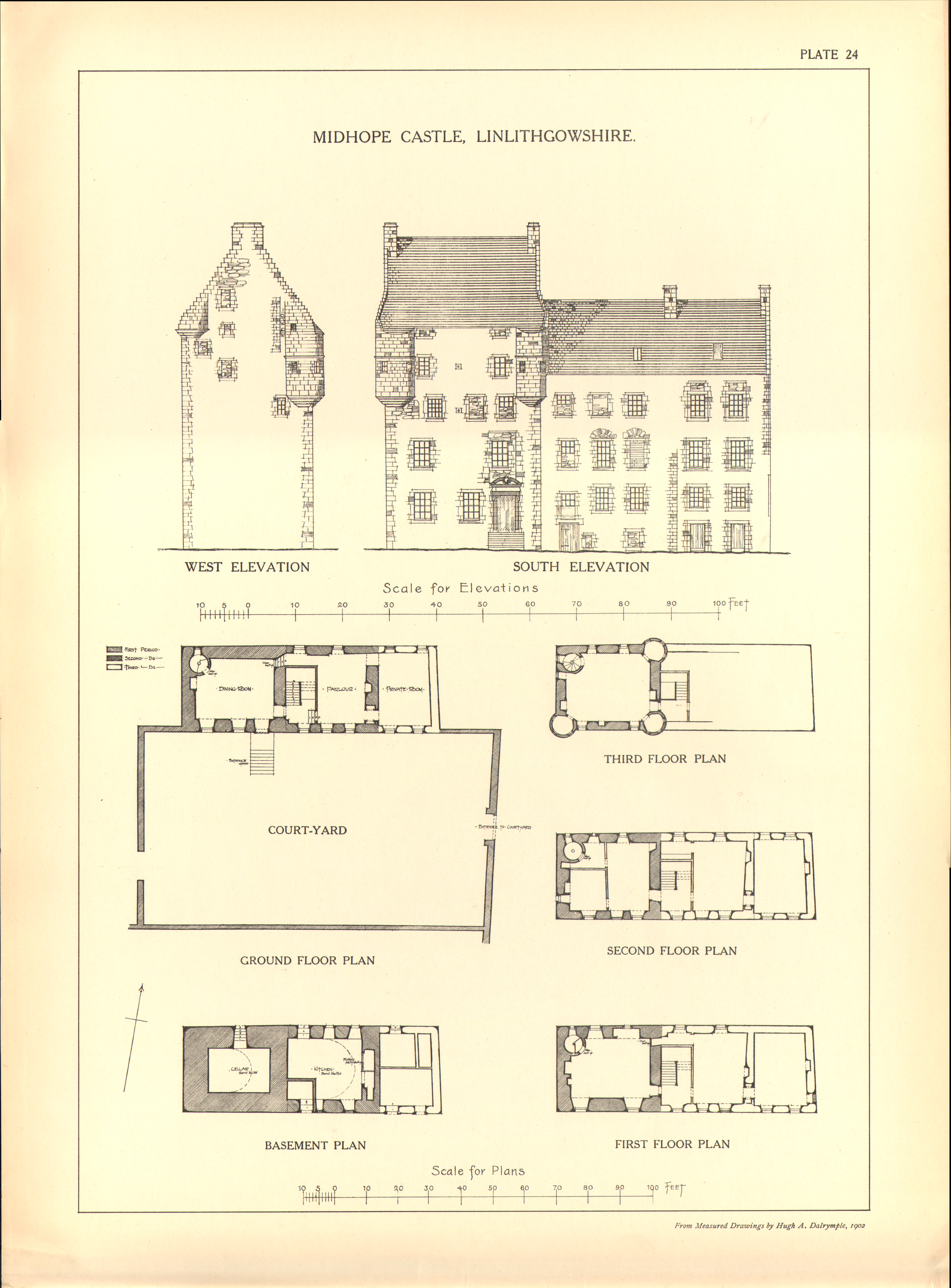
Elevations and plans

== See also ==
- Restoration of castles in Scotland
