= The Caledonian Edinburgh Hotel =

Hotel in Edinburgh, Scotland

Coordinates: 55.9500°N 3.2073°W

The Caledonian Edinburgh
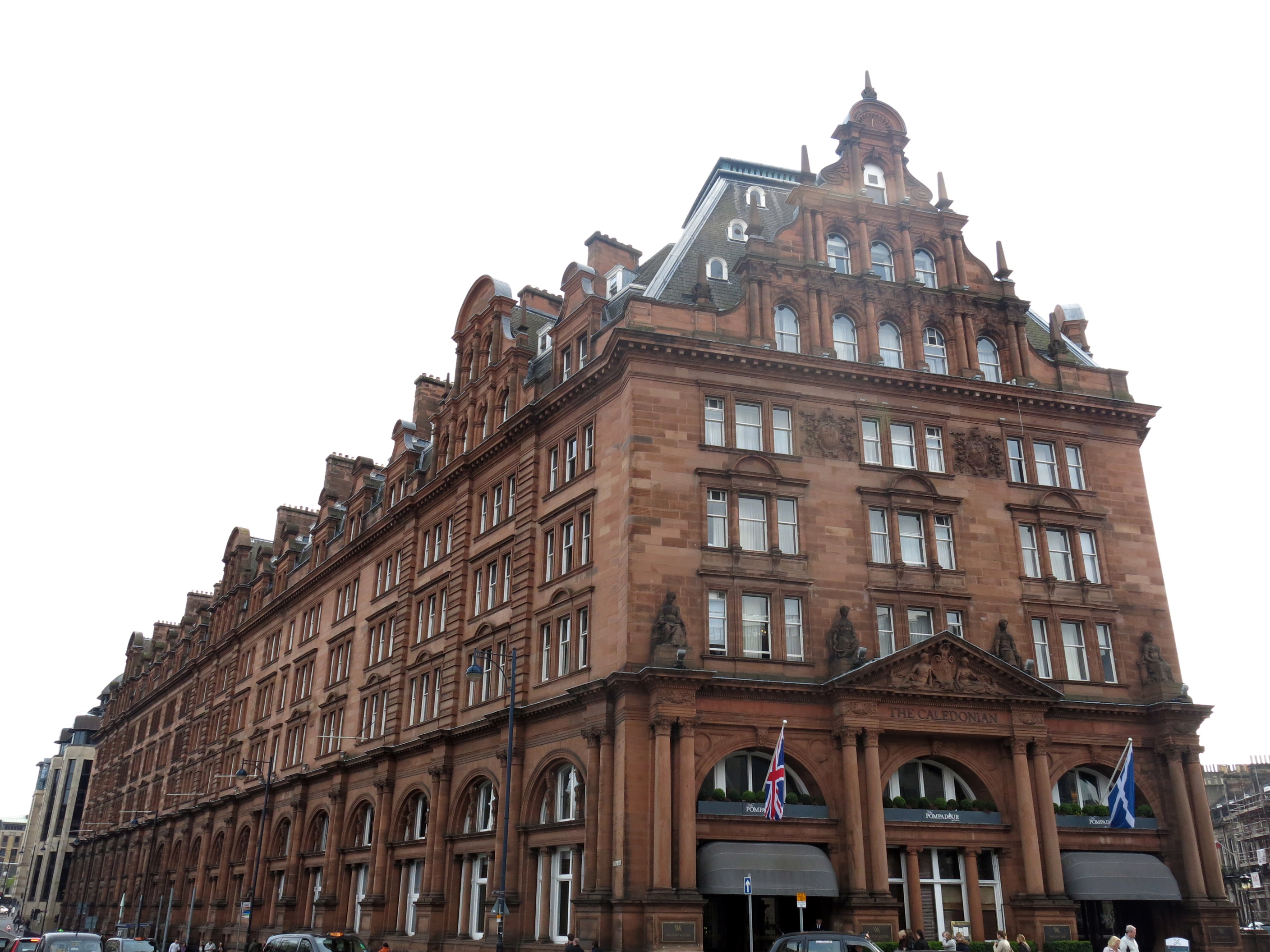

- Location within Edinburgh city centre
- Hotel chain: Curio Collection by Hilton

General information
- Type: Luxury hotel
- Classification: 5 stars
- Location: Edinburgh, EH1 2AB; Scotland, Princes Street
- Opened: 21 December 1903
- Renovated: 2011
- Renovation cost: £24 million
- Owner: Henderson Park Capital
- Operator: Klarent Hospitality

Design and construction
- Architects: John More Dick Peddie and George Washington Browne

Other information
- Number of rooms: 241
- Number of restaurants: 3
- Parking: Yes

Website
- Official website

The Caledonian Edinburgh is a five-star hotel in Edinburgh, Scotland. It was built by the Caledonian Railway company and was opened in 1903. The hotel stands at the west end of Princes Street on the site of the Caledonian Railway's former Edinburgh terminus. It is an example of a British grand railway hotel. It is nicknamed "The Caley", and is a category A listed building.

== History ==
=== Construction ===
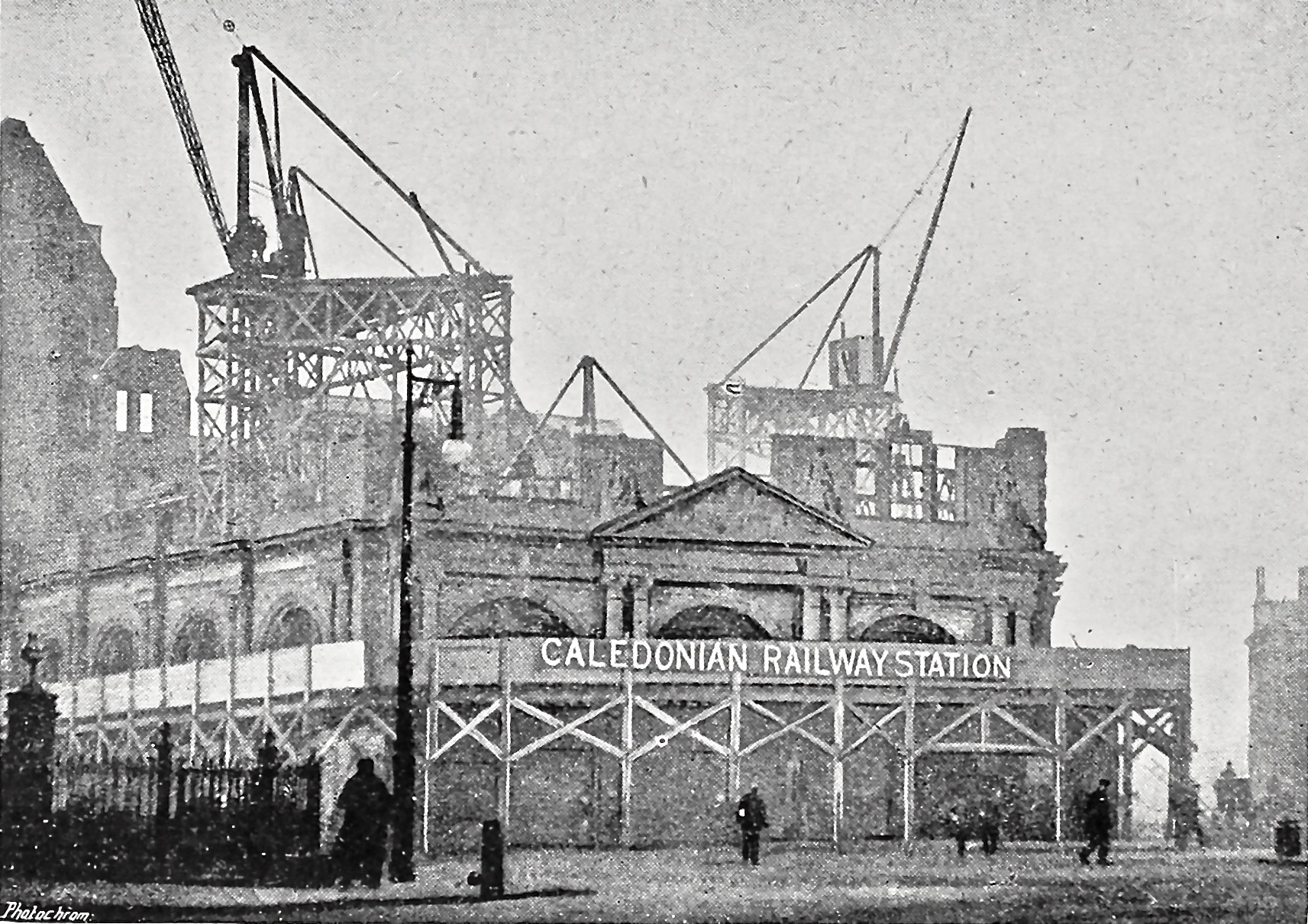
The hotel under construction

The Caledonian Station Hotel was constructed from 1899 to 1903 as part of the Caledonian Railway's Edinburgh Princes Street railway station. The hotel was built on top of the stone, V-shaped station building, which had recently been built as a replacement for the previous wooden station, damaged in a fire in June 1890. It was designed by architects John More Dick Peddie and George Washington Browne. Peddie's assistant and job architect was John Wilson.

The hotel was built with 205 rooms, with decor in the style of Louis XV. The grand arches at the front of the hotel also provided access to the railway station below. The red sandstone façade has been a city landmark throughout the hotel's history.

=== Operation as a railway hotel ===
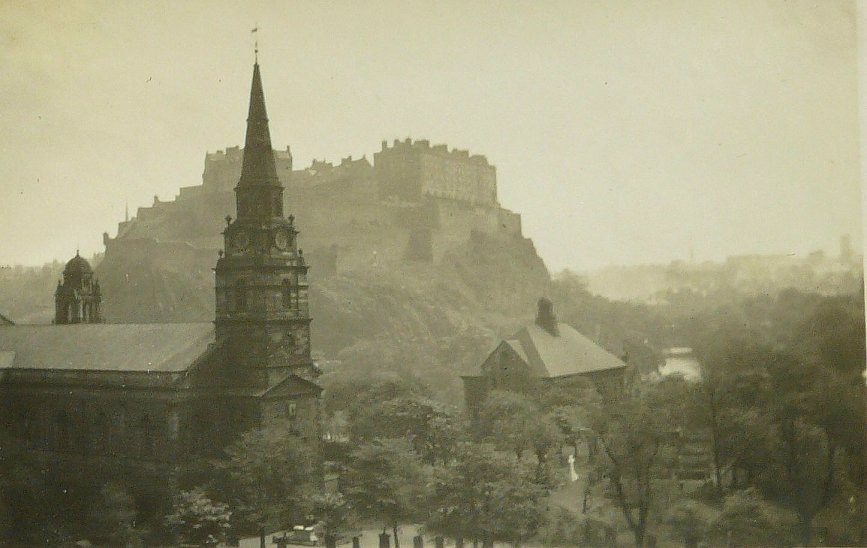
View from the hotel in 1938

Opened on 21 December 1903, the Caledonian Station Hotel was a rival to the North British Railway's North British Station Hotel, which opened at the other end of Princes Street the previous year.

The hotel's name was later shortened to the Caledonian Hotel. The Caledonian Railway Company merged with the larger London, Midland and Scottish Railway in 1923. After the merger, the hotel was renovated. Its Louis XIV drawing room was converted in 1925 to a luxury restaurant, the Pompadour, named for Madame de Pompadour the influential mistress of Louis XV.

The hotel was nationalized by the British Transport Commission on 1 January 1948, when the London, Midland and Scottish Railway was consolidated into the state-owned British Railways. The hotel's interiors were redesigned by brothers Robert and Roger Nicholson between 1956 and 1958.

=== Station closure and privatisation ===
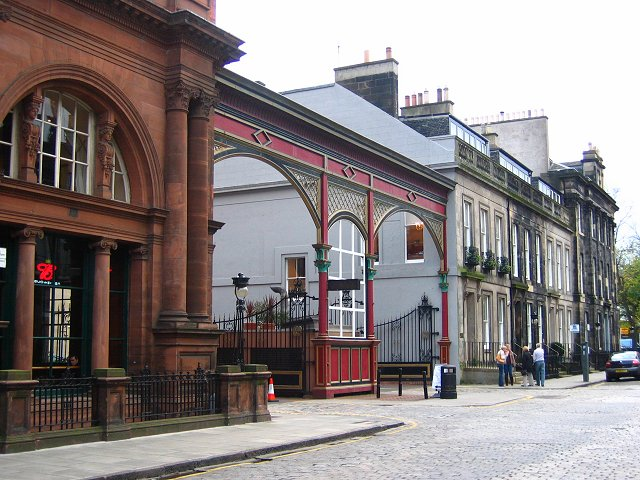
View of preserved station gates from Rutland Street

Princes Street Station closed on 6 September 1965 and was demolished by 1970. This provided room for expansion of the hotel, with 50 more rooms in a new wing. The cast iron gates at the entrance to a car park in Rutland Street are the only remainder of the station outwith the hotel. The original station clock, pre-dating the fire of 1890, has been preserved in the hotel.

The Caledonian Hotel was operated by British Transport Hotels until that entity was dissolved under Margaret Thatcher's privatization initiative. A 2/3 interest in the hotel was sold jointly with the North British Hotel and the Gleneagles Hotel on 18 June 1981 to Gleneagles Hotels plc for £5.75 million. The remaining 1/3 interest in the three properties was sold in March 1984. The Caledonian was sold to Norfolk Capital Hotels in 1984, which sold the hotel to Queens Moat Houses in 1990.

=== Operation under Hilton ===
The Caledonian was purchased by Hilton International in March 2000 for £44.2m, and it was renamed the Caledonian Hilton Edinburgh.

A £24 million refurbishment in 2011 put the hotel within the luxury flagship Waldorf Astoria brand, and it was renamed Waldorf Astoria Edinburgh - The Caledonian. By the time of the refurbishment, the hotel had 241 rooms. The refurbishment plans included the addition and improvement of the public spaces, rooms, spa and restaurant. The original station concourse and ticket office were roofed over to provide a bar and lounge area, named Peacock Alley, which incorporates the station clock. The hotel's fine dining restaurant, The Pompadour, was refurbished in 2021 and reopened under the name Dean Banks at The Pompadour. It also provides a Scottish restaurant, Grazing by Mark Greenaway, opened in 2019.

=== Present day ===
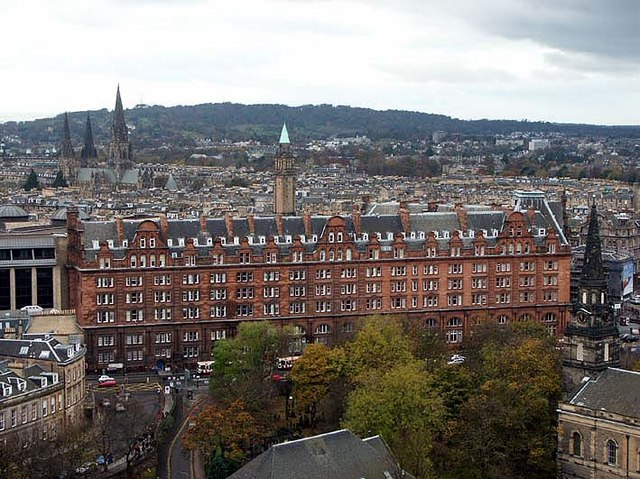
View of hotel from castle showing the Lothian Road side of the building

Hilton sold the Caledonian to Twenty14 Holdings, the hospitality investment arm of Abu Dhabi-based Lulu Group International, for £85m in January 2018. Hilton continued to manage the property. The new owners announced plans to remodel the hotel and add 50 more rooms, at a cost of £20m.

In July 2023, private real estate investment fund manager Henderson Park, together with its in-house hospitality operator and asset manager Klarent Hospitality, purchased the hotel for £85m. On 28 March 2024, they announced that the hotel would be rebranded as part of the Curio Collection by Hilton in Summer 2024. A £35m renovation and expansion will follow, increasing the hotel's capacity to over 300 rooms by early 2026. The hotel was rebranded The Caledonian Edinburgh, Curio Collection by Hilton on 5 June 2024.

== See also ==
- British Transport Hotels
