= List of listed buildings in Falkirk (council area) =

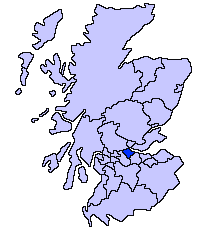
Falkirk shown within Scotland

This is a list of listed buildings in the Falkirk council area, Scotland. The list is split out by parish.

- List of listed buildings in Abercorn, Falkirk
- List of listed buildings in Airth, Falkirk
- List of listed buildings in Bo'Ness And Carriden, Falkirk
- List of listed buildings in Bo'Ness, Falkirk
- List of listed buildings in Denny And Dunipace, Falkirk
- List of listed buildings in Denny, Falkirk
- List of listed buildings in Dunipace, Falkirk
- List of listed buildings in Falkirk, Falkirk
- List of listed buildings in Grangemouth, Falkirk
- List of listed buildings in Larbert, Falkirk
- List of listed buildings in Muiravonside, Falkirk
- List of listed buildings in Slamannan, Falkirk

== See also ==
- Scheduled monuments in Falkirk
