= Fine Arts Commission =

Fine Arts Commission may refer to:

- United States Commission of Fine Arts
- Royal Fine Art Commission (UK, 1922–99)
- Royal Fine Art Commission (1840s) on the decoration of the rebuilt Houses of Parliament
- Royal Fine Art Commission for Scotland
- Commission (art), the hiring and payment for the creation of a piece of art

== See also ==
- Fine art
