= Crowne Plaza Glasgow =

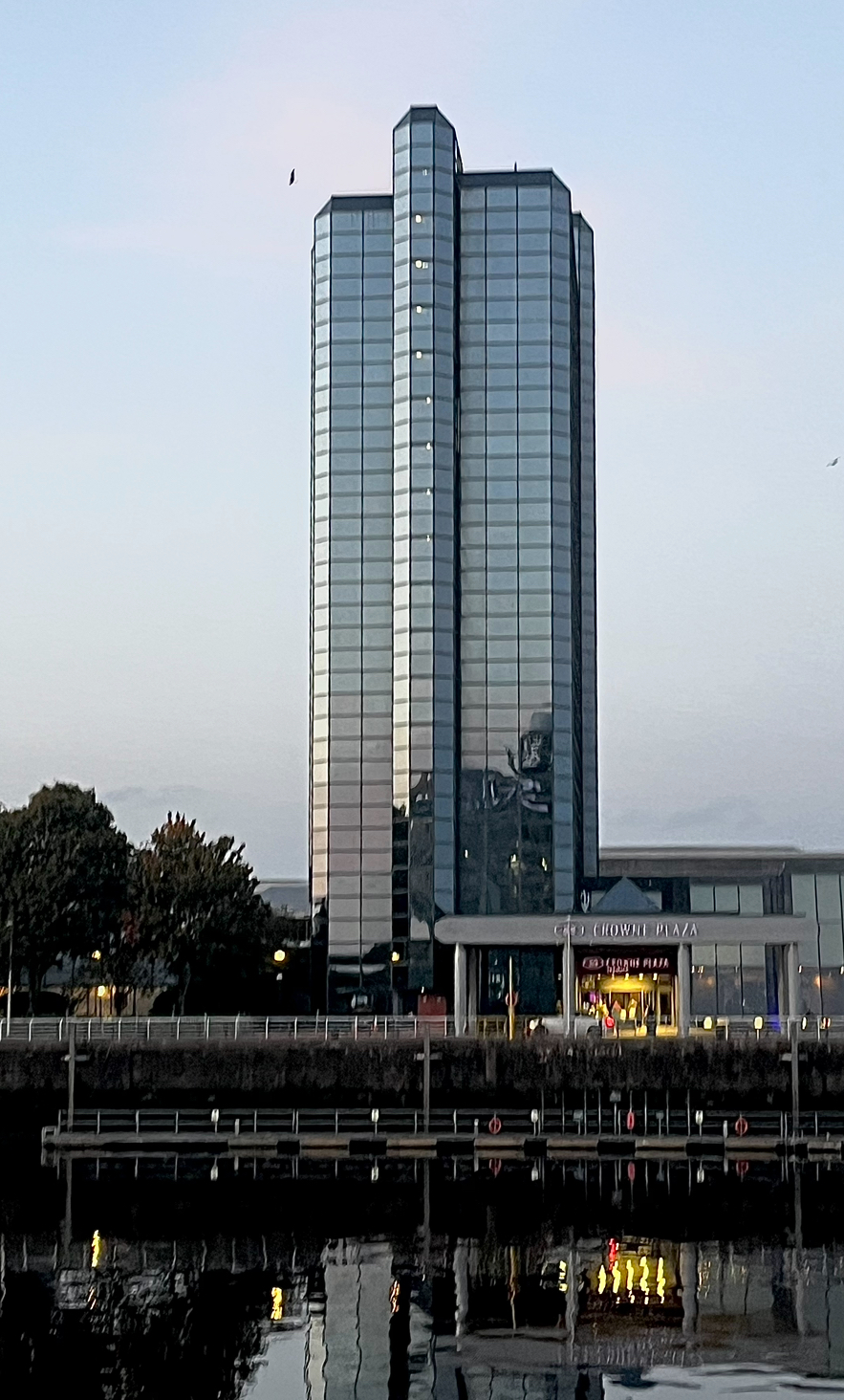
- Crowne Plaza tower on the banks of the River Clyde, October 2023
- Interactive map of the Crowne Plaza Glasgow area
- Former names: Forum Hotel; Glasgow Moat House Hotel

General information
- Status: Completed
- Type: Hotel
- Architectural style: International Modern
- Location: 3 Congress Road, Finnieston, Glasgow, Scotland
- Coordinates: 55°51′35.05″N 4°17′25.16″W
- Construction started: 1987
- Completed: 1989
- Cost: £22.5M
- Owner: IHG Hotels & Resorts

Height
- Roof: 180 ft (55 m)

Technical details
- Structural system: Reinforced Concrete
- Floor count: 17
- Lifts/elevators: 6

Design and construction
- Architecture firm: Coban & Lironi
- Structural engineer: W.A Fairhurst & Partners
- Quantity surveyor: W.T Partnership
- Main contractor: Rush & Tompkins Group PLC

Website
- crowneplazaglasgow.com

Crowne Plaza Glasgow is a 17–storey high-rise hotel in the Finnieston area of Glasgow, Scotland. Originally opened in 1989, it is a 4-star property on the banks of the River Clyde adjacent to the SEC Centre, the SEC Armadillo and the OVO Hydro. The building (along with the adjacent SEC Campus buildings), is frequently used as one of the most recognisable images of the modern Clydeside.

== Background ==
The need for a new hotel next to the SEC had been recognised since the scheme's inception – the initial plans for the building were first unveiled in 1984. The Glasgow Hoteliers' Association blocked the plans initially claiming that the city did not need any more hotel capacity, but later relented when an agreement was struck with the Scottish Development Agency (SDA) that it would only contribute taxpayer funding to new hotels of up to 200 bedrooms.

However, further controversy erupted two years later when it was revealed that the SDA's grant to the project totalled £3.4M, whilst at the same time the plans had now grown in size that the proposed hotel now had 300 bedrooms – effectively breaching the earlier agreement that the Glasgow Hoteliers' Association had reached with the SDA. Nonetheless, the then Secretary of State for Scotland, Malcolm Rifkind approved the development, and groundbreaking began in 1987.

== Construction and opening ==
Construction of the building's superstructure began in 1988, its construction featuring prominently across the Clyde from the Glasgow Garden Festival of that year. It opened the following year as the Forum Hotel, and later came under the ownership of Queens Moat Houses where it was renamed the Glasgow Moat House International, which was later shortened to Glasgow Moat House.

In 2005, Queens Moat Houses entered into a franchise agreement with InterContinental Hotels Group to operate the hotel as a Crowne Plaza hotel.

== In popular culture ==
The building frequently appears on current affairs TV programmes broadcast from the STV and BBC Scotland studios on the opposite bank of the river.

The building is notable for having no designated thirteenth floor, meaning that despite the top floor being designated "16", it is really a fifteen-story building (an example of Triskaidekaphobia). One of the three lifts serving the main tower of the hotel is glass-sided, giving views upstream of the Clyde and the Kingston Bridge. It has the second-largest function room in the city, just behind that of the Glasgow Hilton.

The hotel's ballroom was frequently used as the location of the Glasgow auditions of The X-Factor (most notably 2007 winner Leon Jackson's initial audition was filmed there) before they moved to Hampden Park in 2008, and then to the neighbouring SEC Armadillo when the show changed to a live audition format.

== See also ==
- List of tallest buildings and structures in Glasgow
