= Bo'ness Town Hall =

Municipal Building in Bo'ness, Scotland

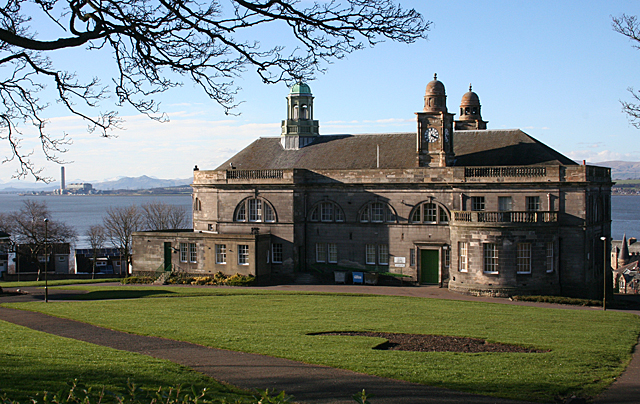
- Bo'ness Town Hall

- Shown in Falkirk
- 56.0157°N 3.6082°W
- Location: Stewart Avenue, Bo'ness

History
- Built: 1904

Site notes
- Architect: George Washington Browne
- Architectural style: Renaissance style

Listed Building – Category B
- Official name: Stewart Avenue, Town Hall and former Carnegie Library including boundary walls and gatepiers
- Designated: 25 November 1980
- Reference no.: LB22397

Bo'ness Town Hall is a municipal building in Stewart Avenue, Bo'ness, Scotland. The structure, which was the meeting place of Bo'ness Burgh Council, is a Category B listed building.

== History ==
The first town hall was a building with a clock tower in North Street which was completed in around 1780. It became structurally unstable as a result of mine workings, located just 15 meters below the surface, and partially collapsed in 1885. In the 1890s, in the context of continuing concerns about the structural integrity of the old town hall, the burgh commissioners decided to procure a new building. The site they selected for the proposed new building and surrounding park was occupied by a mansion known as The Manse which was the residence of the minister at Bo'ness Old Kirk.

A design completion was held and a tender by George Washington Browne was accepted in October 1902. The Scottish-American industrialist and philanthropist, Andrew Carnegie, offered to pay for the cost of a public library in the building and his contribution was supplemented by a donation from the Common Good Fund.

The new building was designed in the Renaissance style, built in ashlar stone at a cost of £12,000 and was officially opened by the Edinburgh City Librarian, Hew Morrison, on 14 September 1904. The ceremony involved the burial of glass jar, which contained copies of The Scotsman, The Glasgow Herald, The Bo'ness Journal and The Linlithgow Gazette, as well as a list of councillors and a copy of the council minutes: a memorial stone was laid on top of the jar to identify where it had been laid. The design involved an asymmetrical main frontage with nine bays facing onto Stewart Avenue; the central section of three bays, which was recessed, featured a doorway in the left hand bay and Diocletian windows on the first floor. The left hand section curved round to the rear of the building which faced the park and, at roof level, in addition to a balustrade, there were two small clock towers at the east end and a lantern at the west end.

Queen Elizabeth II, accompanied by the Duke of Edinburgh, visited the town hall during a royal tour of Scotland in July 1955. The town hall continued to serve as the headquarters of the burgh council for much of the 20th century but ceased to be local seat of government after the enlarged Falkirk District Council was formed in 1975. The public library relocated to an early 18th-century building, previously known as the West Pier Tavern, on Scotland Street in 1980, and the town hall subsequently functioned mainly as a local events venue, becoming an approved venue for wedding and civil partnership ceremonies.

== See also ==
- List of listed buildings in Bo'ness And Carriden, Falkirk
