= List of listed buildings in Denny, Falkirk =

This is a list of listed buildings in the parish of Denny in Falkirk, Scotland.

== List ==
Name	Location	Date Listed	Grid Ref. (Note: Sometimes known as OSGB36, the grid reference (where provided) is based on the British national grid reference system used by the Ordnance Survey. • "Guide to National Grid". Ordnance Survey. • "Get-a-map". Ordnance Survey.)	Geo-coordinates	Notes	LB Number (Note: Historic Environment Scotland assign a unique alphanumeric identifier to each designated site in Scotland, for listed buildings this always begins with "LB", for example "LB12345".)	Image
Denovan House, Dunipace				56°01′43″N 3°53′40″W	Category B	6631	Upload Photo
New Carron Bridge				56°01′52″N 4°00′36″W	Category B	1965	Upload Photo
Old Bridge Faughlin Burn				56°01′35″N 4°01′11″W	Category B	1964	Upload Photo
Denny, Tarduff Place, Carrongrove Mill, Carrongrove House				56°01′27″N 3°55′57″W	Category B	50279	Upload Photo
Church, Hall And Old Graveyard Dennyloanhead				55°59′57″N 3°54′35″W	Category B	1961	Upload Photo
76 Broad Street				56°01′20″N 3°54′11″W	Category C(S)	1966	Upload Photo
Haggs Church				55°59′29″N 3°56′16″W	Category C(S)	1962	Upload Photo
Crown Hotel Dennyloanhead				55°59′56″N 3°54′39″W	Category C(S)	1963	Upload Photo

== Key ==
The scheme for classifying buildings in Scotland is:

- Category A: "buildings of national or international importance, either architectural or historic; or fine, little-altered examples of some particular period, style or building type."
- Category B: "buildings of regional or more than local importance; or major examples of some particular period, style or building type, which may have been altered."
- Category C: "buildings of local importance; lesser examples of any period, style, or building type, as originally constructed or moderately altered; and simple traditional buildings which group well with other listed buildings."

In March 2016 there were 47,288 listed buildings in Scotland. Of these, 8% were Category A, and 50% were Category B, with the remaining 42% being Category C.

== See also ==
- List of listed buildings in Falkirk (council area)
