= List of listed buildings in Dunipace, Falkirk =

This is a list of listed buildings in the parish of Dunipace in the Falkirk council area, Scotland.

== List ==
Name	Location	Date listed	Grid ref. (Note: Sometimes known as OSGB36, the grid reference (where provided) is based on the British national grid reference system used by the Ordnance Survey. • "Guide to National Grid". Ordnance Survey. • "Get-a-map". Ordnance Survey.)	Geo-coordinates	Notes	LB number (Note: Historic Environment Scotland assign a unique alphanumeric identifier to each designated site in Scotland, for listed buildings this always begins with "LB", for example "LB12345".)	Image
Dovecot Dunipace Park				56°00′57″N 3°51′55″W	Category B	3958	Upload another image
Dunipace Bridge				56°00′49″N 3°52′15″W	Category B	3959	Upload another image See more images
Denovan Mains				56°01′43″N 3°53′59″W	Category B	3960	Upload Photo
Parish Church Dunipace				56°01′40″N 3°53′40″W	Category B	3956	Upload Photo
The Braes				56°02′25″N 3°55′49″W	Category B	3963	Upload Photo
Torwood Castle				56°02′17″N 3°52′12″W	Category A	3962	Upload another image
Quarter House				56°02′34″N 3°54′41″W	Category B	3961	Upload Photo

== Key ==
The scheme for classifying buildings in Scotland is:

- Category A: "buildings of national or international importance, either architectural or historic; or fine, little-altered examples of some particular period, style or building type."
- Category B: "buildings of regional or more than local importance; or major examples of some particular period, style or building type, which may have been altered."
- Category C: "buildings of local importance; lesser examples of any period, style, or building type, as originally constructed or moderately altered; and simple traditional buildings which group well with other listed buildings."

In March 2016 there were 47,288 listed buildings in Scotland. Of these, 8% were Category A, and 50% were Category B, with the remaining 42% being Category C.

== See also ==
- List of listed buildings in Falkirk (council area)
