= List of listed buildings in Grangemouth, Falkirk =

This is a list of listed buildings in the parish of Grangemouth in Falkirk, Scotland.

== List ==
Name	Location	Date Listed	Grid Ref. (Note: Sometimes known as OSGB36, the grid reference (where provided) is based on the British national grid reference system used by the Ordnance Survey. • "Guide to National Grid". Ordnance Survey. • "Get-a-map". Ordnance Survey.)	Geo-coordinates	Notes	LB Number (Note: Historic Environment Scotland assign a unique alphanumeric identifier to each designated site in Scotland, for listed buildings this always begins with "LB", for example "LB12345".)	Image
Sacred Heart Rc Church Dalratho Road And Drummond Place				56°00′58″N 3°43′05″W	Category C(S)	34040	Upload Photo
Dundas Church Bo'Ness Road				56°01′08″N 3°43′10″W	Category A	34041	Upload Photo
Avondale House				55°59′41″N 3°40′39″W	Category B	8306	Upload Photo
Grangemouth Dock, Former Workshop Building				56°01′27″N 3°43′29″W	Category C(S)	50868	Upload Photo
West Lodge Gatepiers				55°59′30″N 3°43′33″W	Category B	8303	Upload Photo
Carron House				56°01′36″N 3°46′14″W	Category B	8313	Upload Photo
Brightons, Main Street, Brightons Parish Church Including Boundary Wall, Railings, Gatepiers And Gates				55°58′53″N 3°43′08″W	Category C(S)	50051	Upload another image
Bo'Ness Road, Avon Hall And Gatepiers				56°00′55″N 3°42′25″W	Category B	34042	Upload Photo
Ronaldsay Crescent Zetland Parish Church (Old Parish Church)				56°01′03″N 3°43′03″W	Category B	34047	Upload Photo
Howkerse Farm Skinflats				56°02′04″N 3°45′17″W	Category B	8309	Upload Photo
Reddingmuirhead, Shieldhill Road, Reddingmuirhead Community Centre, Including Gatepiers And Boundary Walls				55°58′51″N 3°44′27″W	Category C(S)	47563	Upload Photo
Bo'Ness Road, Avondhu House Hotel And Gate Piers				56°00′58″N 3°42′27″W	Category B	34043	Upload Photo
Swing Bridge, Western Channel And Carron Dock, Grangemouth Docks				56°01′28″N 3°42′52″W	Category B	34048	Upload Photo
Parkhill House				55°59′24″N 3°43′07″W	Category A	8301	Upload another image
The Parish Church Polmont				55°59′40″N 3°42′22″W	Category B	8305	Upload another image
Lodge, Polmont House				55°59′07″N 3°42′48″W	Category C(S)	13680	Upload Photo
Stables, Avondale House				55°59′39″N 3°40′46″W	Category B	8307	Upload Photo
Folly, Avondale Park				55°59′29″N 3°40′43″W	Category B	8308	Upload Photo
Bothkennar Parish Church				56°01′54″N 3°45′40″W	Category B	8310	Upload Photo
Dovecot, Carron House				56°01′27″N 3°46′13″W	Category B	8314	Upload Photo
Dovecot, Dovecot Road, Westquarter				55°59′21″N 3°44′37″W	Category A	8315	Upload another image
Grangemouth Station Road, Former La Scala Cinema				56°01′11″N 3°43′19″W	Category C(S)	50873	Upload another image See more images
Carronflats Road, Abbotsgrange Middle School				56°00′59″N 3°42′56″W	Category B	34045	Upload another image
School House, Polmont				55°59′40″N 3°42′19″W	Category C(S)	8300	Upload Photo
Parkhill, Dovecot				55°59′23″N 3°43′11″W	Category B	8302	Upload Photo
Bothkennar Manse				56°01′55″N 3°45′45″W	Category B	8311	Upload Photo
Old Church, Polmont				55°59′42″N 3°42′23″W	Category C(S)	8316	Upload Photo
Kinneil House, Polmont (Formerly The Manse)				55°59′37″N 3°42′29″W	Category B	8299	Upload Photo
Ronaldshay Crescent And Park Road Grange Church And Church Hall				56°01′04″N 3°43′06″W	Category B	34046	Upload Photo
Westerton Farm House				56°01′47″N 3°46′04″W	Category C(S)	8312	Upload Photo

== Key ==
The scheme for classifying buildings in Scotland is:

- Category A: "buildings of national or international importance, either architectural or historic; or fine, little-altered examples of some particular period, style or building type."
- Category B: "buildings of regional or more than local importance; or major examples of some particular period, style or building type, which may have been altered."
- Category C: "buildings of local importance; lesser examples of any period, style, or building type, as originally constructed or moderately altered; and simple traditional buildings which group well with other listed buildings."

In March 2016 there were 47,288 listed buildings in Scotland. Of these, 8% were Category A, and 50% were Category B, with the remaining 42% being Category C.

== See also ==
- List of listed buildings in Falkirk (council area)
