= List of listed buildings in Bo'ness And Carriden, Falkirk =

This is a list of listed buildings in the parish of Bo'ness And Carriden in Falkirk, Scotland.

Name	Location	Date Listed	Grid Ref. (Note: Sometimes known as OSGB36, the grid reference (where provided) is based on the British national grid reference system used by the Ordnance Survey. • "Guide to National Grid". Ordnance Survey. • "Get-a-map". Ordnance Survey.)	Geo-coordinates	Notes	LB Number (Note: Historic Environment Scotland assign a unique alphanumeric identifier to each designated site in Scotland, for listed buildings this always begins with "LB", for example "LB12345".)	Image
Blackness House				56°00′12″N 3°31′35″W	Category B	4130	Upload Photo
Grangemouth, Inveravon Tower				55°59′58″N 3°40′46″W	Category C(S)	4146	Upload Photo
Railway Viaduct Over River Avon Near Birch-Hill				55°59′20″N 3°39′24″W	Category B	4132	Upload Photo
Grangemouth Road, Avon Bridge				56°00′23″N 3°40′43″W	Category C(S)	4145	Upload Photo
Blackness Lowvalley House				56°00′13″N 3°31′24″W	Category C(S)	4131	Upload another image
Blackness Castle				56°00′21″N 3°30′59″W	Category A	230	Upload another image
Airngath Farm				55°59′43″N 3°36′09″W	Category B	4133	Upload Photo
Muirhouses, 18 And 19 Carriden Brae Including Boundary Walls				56°00′28″N 3°34′30″W	Category B	22370	Upload Photo
Muirhouses, 20 Carriden Brae And Carriden Cottage Including Boundary Walls And Ancillary Structures				56°00′27″N 3°34′28″W	Category C(S)	22371	Upload Photo
25, 27 And 29 North Street				56°01′03″N 3°36′33″W	Category C(S)	22376	Upload Photo
37- 43 (Odd Nos) North Street And 7- 9 Scotland's Close				56°01′04″N 3°36′31″W	Category B	22378	Upload Photo
13 South Street, Former Tolbooth				56°01′02″N 3°36′32″W	Category B	22394	Upload Photo
Union Street, Harbour				56°01′12″N 3°36′25″W	Category C(S)	22399	Upload Photo
14 - 20 (Even Nos) Union Street And 3 - 11 (Odd Nos) Register Street, Former Custom House				56°01′07″N 3°36′22″W	Category B	22400	Upload another image See more images
Bridgeness Lane Bridgeness Cottage Including Boundary Walls				56°00′57″N 3°34′56″W	Category B	22335	Upload Photo
Bridgeness, Kinningars Park Dovecot Including Wall And Capped Pit Shaft				56°00′52″N 3°34′59″W	Category B	22336	Upload Photo
15A And 15B Cadzow Crescent, Tidings Hill Including Gatepiers And Boundary Walls And Ancillary Structures				56°00′50″N 3°36′26″W	Category B	22338	Upload Photo
Market Street, K6 Telephone Kiosk				56°01′04″N 3°36′28″W	Category B	22366	Upload another image
Muirhouses, Carriden Brae, Old Schoolhouse And The Old School House Including Boundary Walls And Ancillary Structures				56°00′28″N 3°34′32″W	Category B	22369	Upload Photo
1 - 11 (Odd Nos) Seaview Place				56°01′00″N 3°36′36″W	Category C(S)	49709	Upload Photo
15 And 17 South Street				56°01′02″N 3°36′31″W	Category C(S)	49711	Upload Photo
24 - 32 (Even Nos) South Street				56°01′01″N 3°36′31″W	Category C(S)	49718	Upload Photo
191-199 (Odd Nos) Corbiehall Including Boundary Walls				56°00′52″N 3°36′57″W	Category B	50167	Upload another image
Dean Road Cemetery Including Gatepiers, Railings And Boundary Walls				56°00′45″N 3°36′55″W	Category C(S)	50485	Upload Photo
Muirhouses, 7 Hope Cottages And 8 Hope Cottages, Cleveland Including Boundary Walls				56°00′27″N 3°34′31″W	Category B	22372	Upload Photo
Muirhouses, 3 And 4 Hope Cottages				56°00′25″N 3°34′32″W	Category C(S)	22374	Upload Photo
North Street, The Hippodrome				56°01′03″N 3°36′30″W	Category A	22380	Upload another image
Scotland's Close, Bo'ness Public Library, Former Old West Pier Tavern				56°01′05″N 3°36′32″W	Category B	22388	Upload Photo
Stewart Avenue, Town Hall And Former Carnegie Library Including Boundary Walls And Gatepiers				56°00′57″N 3°36′29″W	Category B	22397	Upload another image
15 North Street And 27 Waggon Road				56°01′03″N 3°36′34″W	Category B	22403	Upload another image
Church Wynd, Graveyards Including Boundary Walls				56°00′57″N 3°36′38″W	Category A	22350	Upload Photo
Kinneil, 6-8 (Inclusive Nos) Duchess Anne Cottages				56°00′26″N 3°37′56″W	Category B	22362	Upload Photo
26 East Pier Street, Post Office Including Boundary Walls And Gatepiers				56°01′06″N 3°36′25″W	Category C(S)	49702	Upload Photo
8 And 10 Main Street, Ye Olde Carriers Quarters				56°01′03″N 3°36′19″W	Category C(S)	49703	Upload Photo
35 - 41 (Odd Nos) South Street				56°01′03″N 3°36′26″W	Category C(S)	49715	Upload Photo
50 And 52 South Street				56°01′02″N 3°36′28″W	Category C(S)	49720	Upload Photo
Links Road, Ballantine Bo'ness Iron Company Limited, Links Road And Stark's Brae Including Boundary Walls				56°00′58″N 3°35′54″W	Category B	50202	Upload Photo
12A, 14A, 16A And Nos 16-24 (Even Nos) Craigfoot Terrace Including Boundary Walls				56°00′59″N 3°35′21″W	Category C(S)	50483	Upload Photo
109 And 111 Dean Road And 43, 45 And 47 Linlithgow Road, Seaforth Including Boundary Walls				56°00′40″N 3°36′38″W	Category C(S)	50484	Upload Photo
Kinneil, Kinneil House, Bridge				56°00′30″N 3°37′41″W	Category C(S)	50491	Upload Photo
58 - 62 (Even Nos) Union Street, Former Foundry Offices				56°01′05″N 3°36′10″W	Category B	22401	Upload Photo
49 North Street, Dymock's Buildings With Scotland's Close Warehouse And Service Court				56°01′05″N 3°36′30″W	Category A	22379	Upload another image See more images
1 And 3 South Street With 12 North Street				56°01′02″N 3°36′34″W	Category C(S)	22390	Upload Photo
9 South Street				56°01′02″N 3°36′33″W	Category C(S)	22392	Upload Photo
Carriden Old Church And Graveyard Including Gatepiers And Boundary Walls				56°00′50″N 3°34′32″W	Category B	22347	Upload Photo
Glebe Park Bandstand (Off Stewart Avenue)				56°00′55″N 3°36′30″W	Category B	22353	Upload Photo
Kinneil, Kinneil House Including Gatepiers To West And East And Boundary Walls				56°00′26″N 3°38′03″W	Category A	22358	Upload Photo
2 - 6 (Even Nos) Main Street, The Bo'ness Tavern				56°01′03″N 3°36′19″W	Category C(S)	22364	Upload Photo
Muirhouses, Acre Road, Grangewells				56°00′30″N 3°34′37″W	Category B	22367	Upload Photo
43 - 51 (Odd Nos) Corbiehall Including Boundary Walls				56°00′55″N 3°36′43″W	Category B	49701	Upload another image
31 And 33 South Street				56°01′02″N 3°36′28″W	Category C(S)	49714	Upload Photo
47 And 49 South Street				56°01′03″N 3°36′25″W	Category C(S)	49717	Upload Photo
Carriden Brae, Grange Lodge Including Gate Piers And Boundary Walls				56°00′37″N 3°34′33″W	Category C(S)	50480	Upload Photo
Grange Loan, Grange School Including Gatepiers And Boundary Walls				56°00′51″N 3°35′24″W	Category C(S)	50487	Upload Photo
Harbour Road, Plaque Including Boundary Wall				56°00′59″N 3°35′01″W	Category C(S)	50489	Upload Photo
31, 33 And 35 North Street Including Boundary Walls				56°01′04″N 3°36′33″W	Category C(S)	22377	Upload Photo
Bo'ness Station, Former Haymarket Train Shed, Former Wormit Station Building, Signal Box, Footbridge, Goods Office, Goods Yard, Water Tank And Lamp Standards				56°01′05″N 3°36′01″W	Category A	22337	Upload another image See more images
Carriden, Carriden House Including Boundary Walls				56°00′38″N 3°33′55″W	Category A	22339	Upload another image
Carriden, Carriden House, The Steading Including Ancillary Structures				56°00′35″N 3°34′02″W	Category C(S)	22341	Upload Photo
Grahamsdyke Avenue, Caer Edin Including Gatepiers And Boundary Walls				56°00′50″N 3°35′36″W	Category B	22354	Upload Photo
Bridgeness, Harbour Road, The Tower Gardens, Bridgeness Tower				56°00′57″N 3°35′05″W	Category B	22357	Upload Photo
50 And 52 North Street				56°01′04″N 3°36′29″W	Category C(S)	49705	Upload Photo
44 South Street, Turf Tavern				56°01′02″N 3°36′28″W	Category C(S)	49719	Upload Photo
Stewart Avenue, War Memorial				56°00′54″N 3°36′39″W	Category C(S)	49724	Upload Photo
Carriden, Carriden House Ice House				56°00′39″N 3°33′45″W	Category C(S)	50481	Upload Photo
12-16 (Even Nos) Corbiehall Including Boundary Walls, Gates And Railings And Ancillary Structures				56°00′58″N 3°36′42″W	Category C(S)	50482	Upload Photo
Kinneil, Kinneil House, Walled Garden				56°00′24″N 3°37′58″W	Category C(S)	50492	Upload Photo
42 - 54 (Even Nos), North Street, Anchor Tavern				56°01′04″N 3°36′30″W	Category C(S)	22381	Upload Photo
74 North Street				56°01′03″N 3°36′26″W	Category B	22382	Upload another image
Providence Brae, Former St Mary's Roman Catholic Church Including Boundary Wall And Gatepier				56°00′58″N 3°36′31″W	Category B	22386	Upload Photo
39 - 49 (Odd Nos) Scotland's Close				56°01′05″N 3°36′32″W	Category B	22389	Upload another image
5 And 7 South Street With 14 North Street				56°01′02″N 3°36′33″W	Category C(S)	22391	Upload Photo
68 And 70 South Street				56°01′02″N 3°36′24″W	Category C(S)	22396	Upload Photo
Carriden, Carriden House, West Lodge				56°00′35″N 3°34′31″W	Category C(S)	22345	Upload Photo
Carriden Brae, Carriden Parish Church (Church Of Scotland) Including Gate Piers And Boundary Walls				56°00′52″N 3°34′30″W	Category B	22346	Upload another image See more images
101 And 103 Corbiehall Including Boundary Wall				56°00′54″N 3°36′48″W	Category C(S)	22351	Upload Photo
Grange Terrace, St Andrews Parish Church Including Hall And Boundary Walls				56°00′53″N 3°35′42″W	Category B	22355	Upload Photo
Kinneil, 2 - 4 (Inclusive Nos) Duchess Anne Cottages Including Boundary Walls				56°00′29″N 3°37′56″W	Category B	22361	Upload Photo
19 Church Wynd				56°00′58″N 3°36′36″W	Category C(S)	49700	Upload Photo
North Street, Clock And Lamp Standard				56°01′05″N 3°36′28″W	Category C(S)	49706	Upload Photo
15 Seaview Place, Former Bank And Burgh Chambers Including Boundary Wall And Gatepier				56°01′00″N 3°36′37″W	Category C(S)	49710	Upload Photo
43 And 45 South Street				56°01′03″N 3°36′26″W	Category C(S)	49716	Upload Photo
62 South Street				56°01′02″N 3°36′25″W	Category C(S)	49721	Upload Photo
37 Stewart Avenue, Former Liberal Hall				56°00′58″N 3°36′31″W	Category C(S)	49723	Upload Photo
17 Cadzow Crescent, Former Nurses' Home Including Gatepiers And Boundary Walls				56°00′49″N 3°36′23″W	Category C(S)	50479	Upload Photo
Kinneil, 5 Duchess Anne Cottages, Kinneil Museum Including Boundary Wall				56°00′28″N 3°37′57″W	Category B	50490	Upload Photo
Muirhouses, 1 And 2 Hope Cottages				56°00′25″N 3°34′35″W	Category C(S)	22373	Upload Photo
1 Market Street (formerly 76 North St)				56°01′03″N 3°36′27″W	Category C(S)	22383	Upload another image
Panbrae Road, Old Kirk (Church Of Scotland) Including Hall And Boundary Walls				56°00′49″N 3°36′57″W	Category B	22384	Upload Photo
Stewart Avenue, Masonic Lodge Including Boundary Walls And Gatepiers				56°00′58″N 3°36′18″W	Category B	22398	Upload Photo
Erngath Road, The Knowe Including Gatepiers And Boundary Walls				56°00′53″N 3°36′06″W	Category B	22352	Upload Photo
Muirhouses Acre Road The Library House Including Boundary Walls And Ancillary Structures				56°00′28″N 3°34′33″W	Category B	22368	Upload Photo
37 Scotland's Close				56°01′04″N 3°36′32″W	Category C(S)	49708	Upload Photo
Bridgeness Road, Old Grange Schoolhouse, Including Gatepiers And Boundary Walls				56°00′54″N 3°34′42″W	Category C(S)	50478	Upload Photo
73 Grahamsdyke Road Including Gatepiers And Boundary Walls				56°00′48″N 3°35′25″W	Category B	50486	Upload Photo
26 Grange Terrace, Roman House Including Gatepiers And Boundary Walls And Ancillary Structure				56°00′53″N 3°35′54″W	Category B	50488	Upload Photo
Muirhouses, 5 And 6 Hope Cottages Including Boundary Walls				56°00′25″N 3°34′31″W	Category C(S)	22375	Upload Photo
11 South Street				56°01′02″N 3°36′32″W	Category C(S)	22393	Upload Photo
29 - 43 (Odd Nos) Waggon Road And 9 North Street, The Granary				56°01′02″N 3°36′35″W	Category B	22404	Upload another image
Carriden, Carriden House Walled Garden And Gardener's House				56°00′35″N 3°34′14″W	Category B	22342	Upload Photo
57 North Street				56°01′05″N 3°36′29″W	Category C(S)	49704	Upload Photo
North Street And Market Street, Jubilee Fountain				56°01′04″N 3°36′27″W	Category C(S)	49707	Upload Photo
23 - 29 (Odd Nos) South Street, Anderson Building				56°01′02″N 3°36′29″W	Category C(S)	49712	Upload Photo
64, 64A And 66 South Street				56°01′02″N 3°36′25″W	Category C(S)	49722	Upload Photo
54 - 60 (Even Nos) South Street				56°01′02″N 3°36′27″W	Category B	22395	Upload Photo
Braehead, Craigmailen United Free Church Including Gatepiers And Boundary Wall				56°00′52″N 3°36′28″W	Category B	22334	Upload another image See more images
Market Street, Clydesdale Bank				56°01′04″N 3°36′28″W	Category B	22365	Upload another image

== Key ==
The scheme for classifying buildings in Scotland is:

- Category A: "buildings of national or international importance, either architectural or historic; or fine, little-altered examples of some particular period, style or building type."
- Category B: "buildings of regional or more than local importance; or major examples of some particular period, style or building type, which may have been altered."
- Category C: "buildings of local importance; lesser examples of any period, style, or building type, as originally constructed or moderately altered; and simple traditional buildings which group well with other listed buildings."

In March 2016 there were 47,288 listed buildings in Scotland. Of these, 8% were Category A, and 50% were Category B, with the remaining 42% being Category C.

== See also ==
- List of listed buildings in Falkirk (council area)
