= List of listed buildings in Larbert, Falkirk =

This is a list of listed buildings in the parish of Larbert in Falkirk, Scotland.

== List ==
Name	Location	Date Listed	Grid Ref. (Note: Sometimes known as OSGB36, the grid reference (where provided) is based on the British national grid reference system used by the Ordnance Survey. • "Guide to National Grid". Ordnance Survey. • "Get-a-map". Ordnance Survey.)	Geo-coordinates	Notes	LB Number (Note: Historic Environment Scotland assign a unique alphanumeric identifier to each designated site in Scotland, for listed buildings this always begins with "LB", for example "LB12345".)	Image
Kinnaird House				56°02′38″N 3°47′30″W	Category B	10498	Upload Photo
Kinnaird House Walled Gardens				56°02′35″N 3°47′37″W	Category B	10499	Upload Photo
Kinnaird House Stable Group				56°02′39″N 3°47′31″W	Category C(S)	10500	Upload Photo
Old Parish Church Churchyard And Monument To James Bruce Of Kinnaird And Mary Dundas				56°01′08″N 3°50′17″W	Category A	10496	Upload another image See more images
Larbert Old Church (Parish Church)				56°01′09″N 3°50′11″W	Category B	10515	Upload another image See more images
Larbert Viaduct				56°00′59″N 3°49′55″W	Category B	10517	Upload another image See more images
Royal Scottish National Hospital, Lodge				56°01′51″N 3°50′00″W	Category C(S)	47720	Upload another image
Former Railway Bridge Across River Carron Carron Iron Works				56°01′15″N 3°47′52″W	Category B	13306	Upload another image
Larbert House				56°01′20″N 3°50′47″W	Category B	10495	Upload Photo
Kersebrock Farmhouse				56°02′45″N 3°49′10″W	Category C(S)	10497	Upload Photo
Old Manse				56°01′10″N 3°50′16″W	Category B	10516	Upload Photo
Weir Carron Iron Works				56°01′14″N 3°47′59″W	Category B	13305	Upload another image
Stenhousemuir Off Main Street, Carron Grange House				56°01′14″N 3°48′30″W	Category B	13347	Upload another image
Old Bridge Larbert				56°00′58″N 3°49′52″W	Category C(S)	10518	Upload Photo
The Grahamston Cast-Iron Gate				56°01′15″N 3°47′59″W	Category B	31230	Upload another image
Larbert Village Carronvale Road, Woodcroft				56°01′07″N 3°49′28″W	Category B	13348	Upload Photo
Main Street, Dobbie Hall				56°01′29″N 3°49′29″W	Category B	10502	Upload another image
Royal Scottish National Hospital, Principal Block (Private House) With Boundary Walls And Gatepiers				56°01′55″N 3°50′00″W	NOW DEMOLISHED	10481	Upload another image
Carronvale Road, 'Carronvale' (Boy's Brigade Hq)				56°01′02″N 3°49′08″W	Category A	10487	Upload another image See more images
Royal Scottish National Hospital, Skye Building				56°01′57″N 3°49′58″W	NOW DEMOLISHED	48082	Upload Photo
Larbert East Church And Hall King Street, Stenhousemuir				56°01′34″N 3°48′51″W	Category B	10488	Upload another image
Stenhousemuir, Church Street, Parish Church Of Stenhouse And Carron, Former Maclaren Memorial Church, Church Of Scotland				56°01′38″N 3°48′19″W	Category A	10503	Upload Photo
Carron Company, Clock Tower Remnant Of Former Office Block				56°01′21″N 3°47′43″W	Category C(S)	10504	Upload another image

== Key ==
The scheme for classifying buildings in Scotland is:

- Category A: "buildings of national or international importance, either architectural or historic; or fine, little-altered examples of some particular period, style or building type."
- Category B: "buildings of regional or more than local importance; or major examples of some particular period, style or building type, which may have been altered."
- Category C: "buildings of local importance; lesser examples of any period, style, or building type, as originally constructed or moderately altered; and simple traditional buildings which group well with other listed buildings."

In March 2016 there were 47,288 listed buildings in Scotland. Of these, 8% were Category A, and 50% were Category B, with the remaining 42% being Category C.

== See also ==
- List of listed buildings in Falkirk (council area)
