= Royal Fine Art Commission for Scotland =

The Royal Fine Art Commission for Scotland was a Scottish public body.

It was appointed in 1927 "to enquire into such questions of public amenity or of artistic importance relating to Scotland as may be referred to them by any of our Departments of State and to report thereon to such Departments; and furthermore, to give advice on similar questions when so requested by public or quasi-public bodies when it appears to the said Commission that their assistance would be advantageous".

The first Commissioners were-

- Sir John Maxwell Stirling-Maxwell
- Gavin George, Baron Hamilton of Dalzell
- Sir John Ritchie Findlay
- Sir George Macdonald
- Sir George Washington Browne
- Sir Robert Stodart Lorimer
- James Whitelaw Hamilton
- James Pittendrigh Macgillivray

In 2005, it was replaced by Architecture and Design Scotland.

== See also ==
- Royal Fine Art Commission, formerly operated in England and Wales
