= George Washington Browne =

British architect (1853-1939)

Sir George Washington Browne FRIBA PPRSA
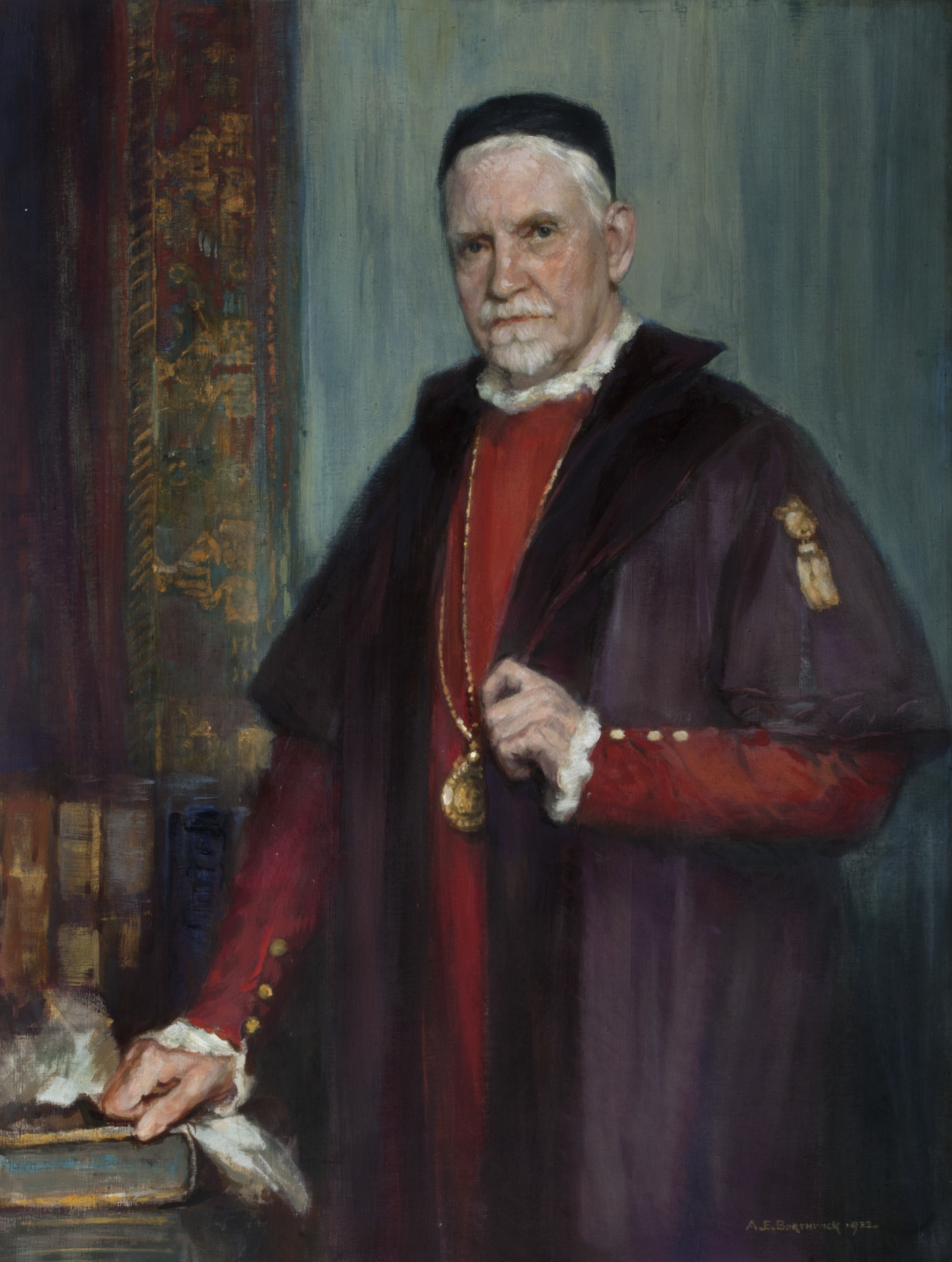
- George Washington Browne in 1932
- Born: 21 September 1853; Glasgow, Scotland
- Died: 15 June 1939 (aged 85); Sambrook, Shropshire, England
- Resting place: Grange Cemetery, Edinburgh
- Education: Glasgow Academy
- Occupation: Architect
- Buildings: Royal Hospital for Sick Children, Edinburgh Central Library

Sir George Washington Browne FRIBA PPRSA (21 September 1853 – 15 June 1939) was a Scottish architect. He was born in Glasgow, and trained there and in London. He spent most of his career in Edinburgh, although his work can be found throughout Scotland and beyond. He was involved in nearly 300 projects, including many public and commercial buildings. One of his most notable buildings is Edinburgh's Central Library, and he became recognised as an authority on library planning and design. He came to national attention after winning a competition to design a bridge over the River Thames in London, although this was never realised. He was the first architect to be elected as President of the Royal Scottish Academy. He also served as President of the Edinburgh Architectural Association, and was instrumental in setting up the Royal Fine Art Commission for Scotland.

== Early life and education ==
George Washington Browne was born in Glasgow on 21 September 1853, the eldest child of Samuel Brown, a cabinet maker, and his wife Sarah Agnew. He attended the Glasgow Academy. At the age of 16, he became articled to the Glasgow architects, Salmon Son & Ritchie, where he worked alongside two friends, James MacLaren and William Flockhart, both of whom went on to have successful careers in architecture. In 1872, the three friends unsuccessfully entered a competition in Building News to design a detached suburban villa.

== Early architectural career ==
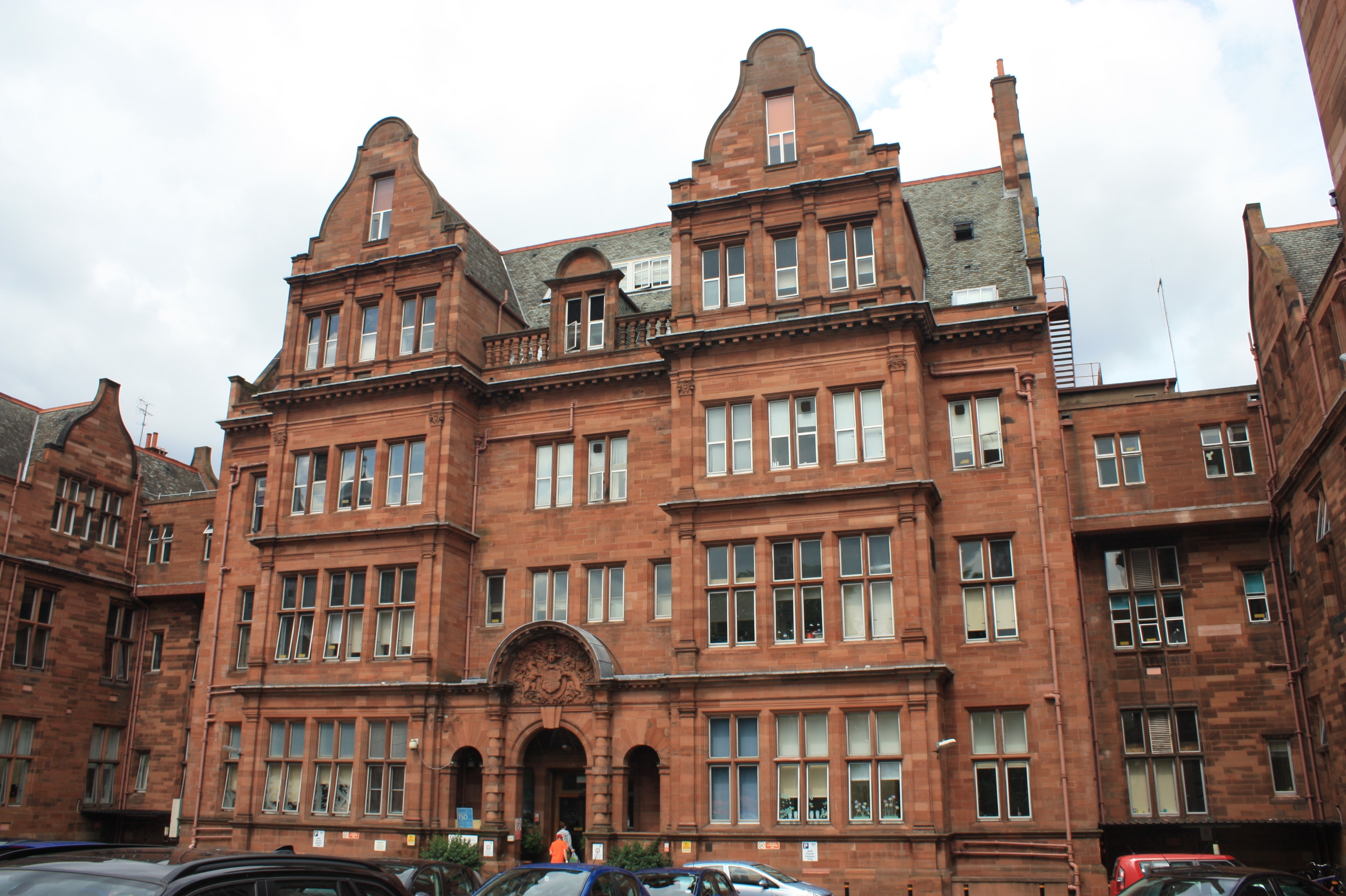
The former Royal Hospital for Sick Children, Edinburgh, which closed in 2021

On completion of his articles in 1873, Browne joined the firm of Campbell Douglas & Sellars. While there, he won the John James Stevenson prize for measured drawing. This led to a move to London, where he obtained a place in Stevenson's firm (then Stevenson & Robson).

After two years with Stevenson, Browne moved to the office of the church architect, Arthur Blomfield. In 1878, while still with Blomfield, he won the prestigious Pugin Studentship of the Royal Institute of British Architects, the first Scotsman to do so. The prize enabled him to study and travel in France and Belgium. As part of his preparation for the prize, he published a large collection of drawings of domestic and ecclesiastical buildings in Scotland and England.

In 1879, after a brief period working for William Eden Nesfield, he returned to Scotland, where he became principal assistant to Robert Rowand Anderson, who was at the time working on designs for the University of Edinburgh Medical School and Glasgow Central Station. In 1881, Browne became Anderson's partner. Two years later, the firm merged with Hew M Wardrop to become Wardrop, Anderson & Browne.

== Independent practice ==
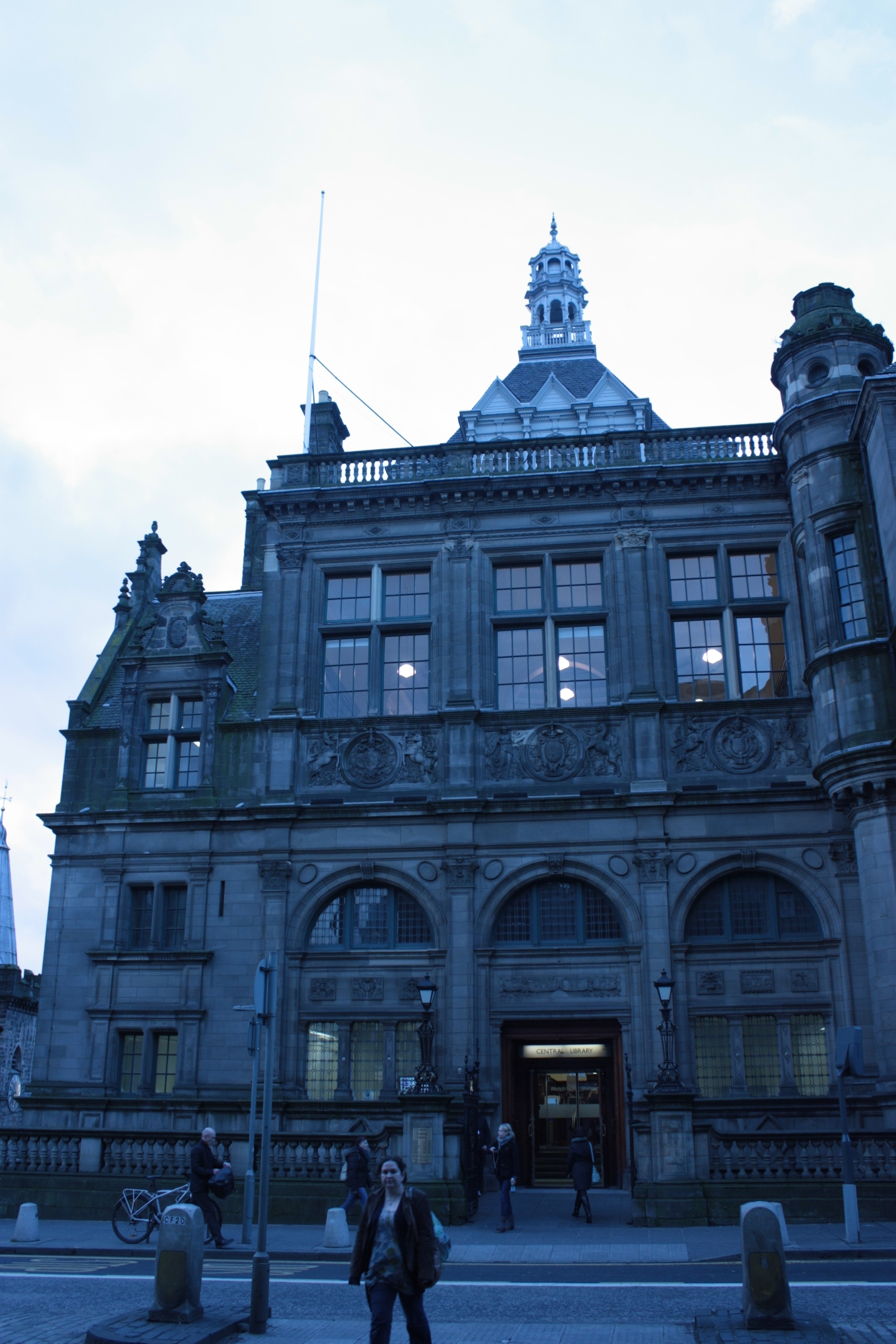
Central (Carnegie) Library on George IV Bridge Edinburgh

In 1885, Browne established an independent practice in Edinburgh, with an office at 5 Queen Street. Two years later, he won the competition to design Edinburgh's Central Library from a field of 30 entrants, this being the first public library in Edinburgh. It led to commissions to design many more public libraries in Scotland and beyond. He went on to become a recognised authority on library design, and later published a paper on the subject and acted as adviser and assessor to library committees.

His other notable works during this period include premises for Redfern Ltd, a "ladies tailors" in Princes Street; the Royal Hospital for Sick Children in Sciennes; several operating theatres for the Royal Infirmary of Edinburgh; the extension of the Advocates Library; and an office for the British Linen Bank in George Street. These successes enabled him to move to a larger office at 8 Albyn Place.

In 1895 or 1896, he went into partnership with John More Dick Peddie. The partnership was initially successful, thanks mainly to commissions for banks, particularly for the British Linen Bank. But by 1907 this work had sharply declined and the partnership was formally dissolved, although Peddie and Browne continued to share the Albyn Place office.

For the remainder of his career, Browne had few commissions, and concentrated instead on competitions. In 1907, he was a finalist in the competition to design County Hall, the headquarters of the London County Council, described as "one of the most notable competitions of a generation". In 1910, he submitted a design for the Usher Hall, but this was not successful. He won the competition for the King Edward VII Memorial at Holyrood Palace, which was erected, in a reduced form, between 1912 and 1922. In 1914 he achieved UK-wide by prominence by winning the competition for a bridge across the River Thames in London opposite St Paul's Cathedral, and was appointed the project's principal architect. However, the project was delayed by the First World War and later abandoned.

From 1913, his work was considerably reduced. Obliged to give up his house in The Grange and his office, he moved his home and place of work to a ground-floor flat at 1 Randolph Cliff. During this time, his only significant project was the YMCA building in St Andrew Street in 1915.

== Honours and appointments ==
In 1892, Browne was admitted as an Associate of the Royal Scottish Academy (RSA). He became a full Academician in 1902, and the academy's treasurer in 1917. In 1924, he was elected 10th President of the RSA, the first architect to hold that post.

Browne was knighted in 1926. In the same year, he was admitted as a Fellow of the Royal Institute of British Architects (RIBA), was awarded an honorary LL.D. degree by the University of Edinburgh, and played a role in organising the RSA's Centenary Exhibition. The following year he received King George V and Queen Mary on their visit to the academy.

He was also involved in the Edinburgh Architectural Association, serving as its president from 1884 to 1886. He was Head of Architecture at Edinburgh College of Art from 1914 to 1922. He helped set up the Royal Fine Art Commission for Scotland in 1927.

== Personal life ==
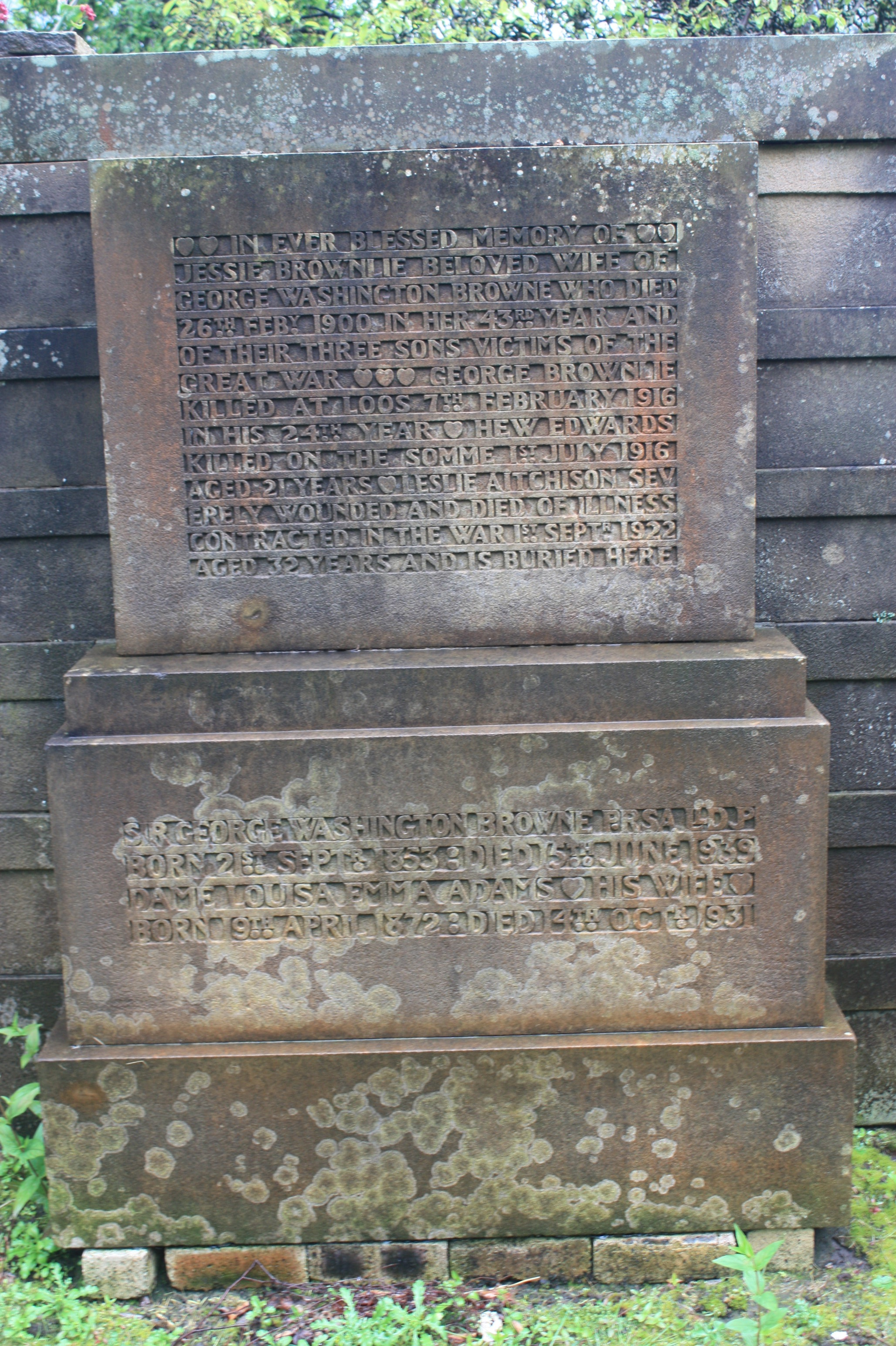
The grave of George Washington Browne and his second wife and eldest son in the Grange Cemetery, Edinburgh

In 1881, Browne married Jessie Brownlie, the eldest daughter of Robert Brownlie of Glasgow. The couple had five children, only one of whom survived Browne. Their two younger sons, George Brownlie Browne and Hew Edwards Browne, were both killed in action in 1916 (aged 24 and 19 respectively). Their eldest son, Leslie Aitchison Browne, died in 1922 (aged 32) as a result wounds suffered at Ypres in 1916. Their eldest daughter, Christina, who had married James Strachan McLeod, died of heart disease in 1920 (aged 37). Jessie Browne died at the age of 43 in 1900 as the result of appendicitis.

In the mid-1890s, Browne designed his own family home, The Limes, at 17 Blackford Road (now number 35) in The Grange. He occupied the house from approximately 1896 to 1914.

In 1905, Browne married his second wife, Louisa Emma Adams, youngest daughter of Rev. D.D.L. Adams. She died of cancer in 1931, at the age of 59.

In 1938, failing health and diminishing finances obliged Browne to leave his flat in Randolph Cliff and move to the home of his surviving daughter, Jessie Agnew Preston, the wife of Norman Preston, in Sambrook, Shropshire. He died there on 15 June 1939, at the age of 85. The RSA took charge of his funeral, the service being conducted in the academy's library.

George Washington Browne is buried in Grange Cemetery along with his second wife and eldest son. A monument on his grave also commemorates his first wife and his two younger sons.

== List of principal works ==
The Dictionary of Scottish Architects lists 297 projects on which Browne was engaged between 1878 and 1934, either as sole architect or in collaboration with others (including several unsuccessful competition entries). All but five of these are in Scotland. The following are some notable examples from that list:

- Central Station Hotel, Glasgow (1879)
- Reconstruction of the Conservative Club, Princes Street, Edinburgh (1879)
- St Andrews Parish Church, North Berwick (1880)
- House for Professor Cossar Ewart, Penicuik (1883) (now the Craigiebield House hotel)
- St Margaret's Episcopal Church, Biel, East Lothian (1884)
- Stornoway Parish Church, Isle of Lewis (1884)
- Hamilton Parish Church Hall and School (1885)
- Braid Church, Nile Grove, Edinburgh (1886)
- Edinburgh City Library, George IV Bridge (1887) (as a competition winner)
- Bruntsfield Place tenements, Edinburgh (1887)
- Solicitors Buildings/Library, Edinburgh Supreme Court (1888)
- Maison Dieu Church, Brechin Angus (1890)
- Eight branches of the British Linen Bank (1890- 1907)
- Drumsheugh Toll House in Dean Village Edinburgh (1891)
- Remodelling of 1 Randolph Cliff as his own family home (1891)
- Royal Hospital for Sick Children, Sciennes, Edinburgh (1891)
- Miss Cranston's Tea Rooms Buchanan Street Glasgow (1895) (not to be confused with her Willow Tearooms on Sauchiehall Street by Charles Rennie MacKintosh)
- Standard Life Assurance Building, 1-31 George Street, Edinburgh (1896)
- Public (Carnegie) Library, Jedburgh (1898)
- Caledonian Hotel, Lothian Road, Edinburgh (1899-1903) (now the Waldorf Astoria Caledonian)
- North British and Mercantile Insurance Office, Leeds (1900)
- Bo'ness Town Hall and Library (1901) (competition winner)
- Kelso Public Library (1905)
- Bank of Scotland, 69 George St, Edinburgh (1905)
- Scottish National Memorial to Edward VII at Holyrood Palace (1911 but built 1920–2)
- Nine World War I war memorials (1918-1924)

== Publications ==
- Browne, George (1889). "General indifference to modern architecture". The Scottish Art Review. 1: 57–59.
- Browne, George (1890). "Planning of Public Libraries". A paper given to the Architectural Section of the Philosophical Society of Glasgow and later printed in The Builder.
