= Airth Castle =

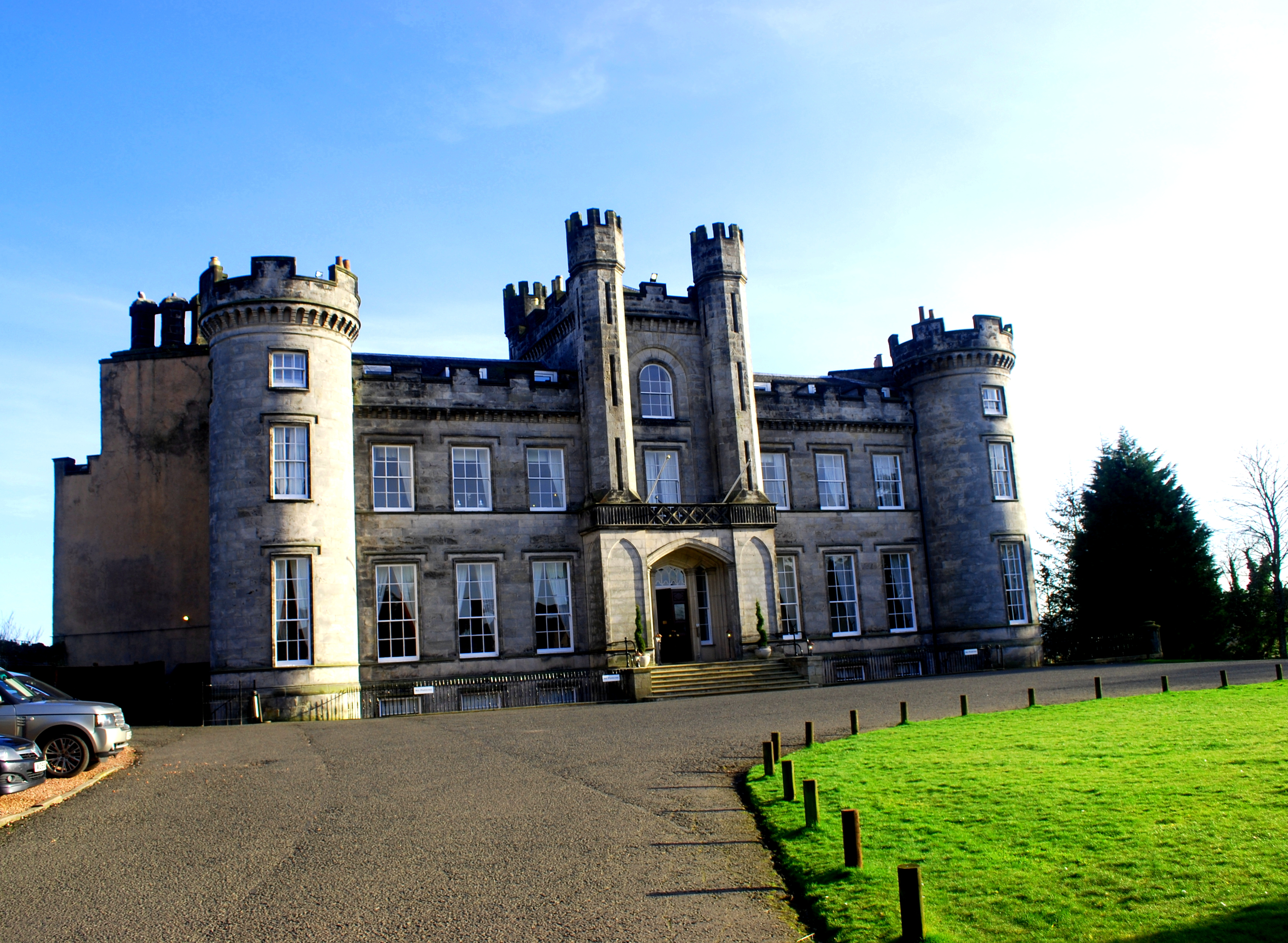
- Airth Castle in 2015

- Location within Falkirk
- 56.06131°N 3.77138°W

Listed Building – Category A
- Designated: 25 October 1972
- Reference no.: LB2102

Airth Castle is a castle overlooking the village of Airth and the River Forth, in the Falkirk area of Scotland. Until 2023, the castle operated as a hotel and spa.

== History ==
According to an account attributed to Blind Harry, in 1298 William Wallace attacked a previous wooden fortification on this site to rescue his imprisoned uncle, a priest from Dunipace. A later castle was burnt or destroyed after the defeat of King James III at Sauchieburn in 1488, and Robert Bruce of Airth was given £100 Scots towards rebuilding. The southwest tower is the earliest part, dating to the period immediately thereafter. An extension was added on the east side in the mid 16th century.

Airth Castle was owned by Falcones. Mary Bruce, a daughter of the laird of Airth, was a companion of Mary, Queen of Scots in England. The family were Jacobite sympathizers who were forced to sell after the failure of the 1715 rising.

The castle is a major historic building that retains much medieval fabric. As such, Historic Environment Scotland has designated it a Category A listed building. The ruins of the former parish church of Airth are within the grounds.

Airth Castle is owned by Airth Castle Limited and was operated by Airth Castle Hotel & Spa, a company formed in 2004. It was a popular wedding venue. The operator entered administration and ceased trading in March 2023.

Parts of the Airth Castle Hotel building were destroyed when a fire broke out during the early hours of 23 September 2024.

== Ghostlore ==
The castle, like many in the area, has a variety of ghostlore stories associated with it. These stories include:

- Sightings of a nanny with two young children who are said to have died in a fire at the castle.
- The sound of children playing being heard in rooms 3, 4, 9 and 23.
- Heavy footsteps can be heard outside room 14 before suddenly stopping and disappearing.
- People have also reported hearing cries and screams believed to be from a maid who was attacked by her master and left to die.
- A ghost dog, with a predilection for biting ankles, is believed to roam the hallways.
- A groundsman reportedly haunts the lower floor of the castle.
