= John More Dick Peddie =

British architect (1853 – 1921)

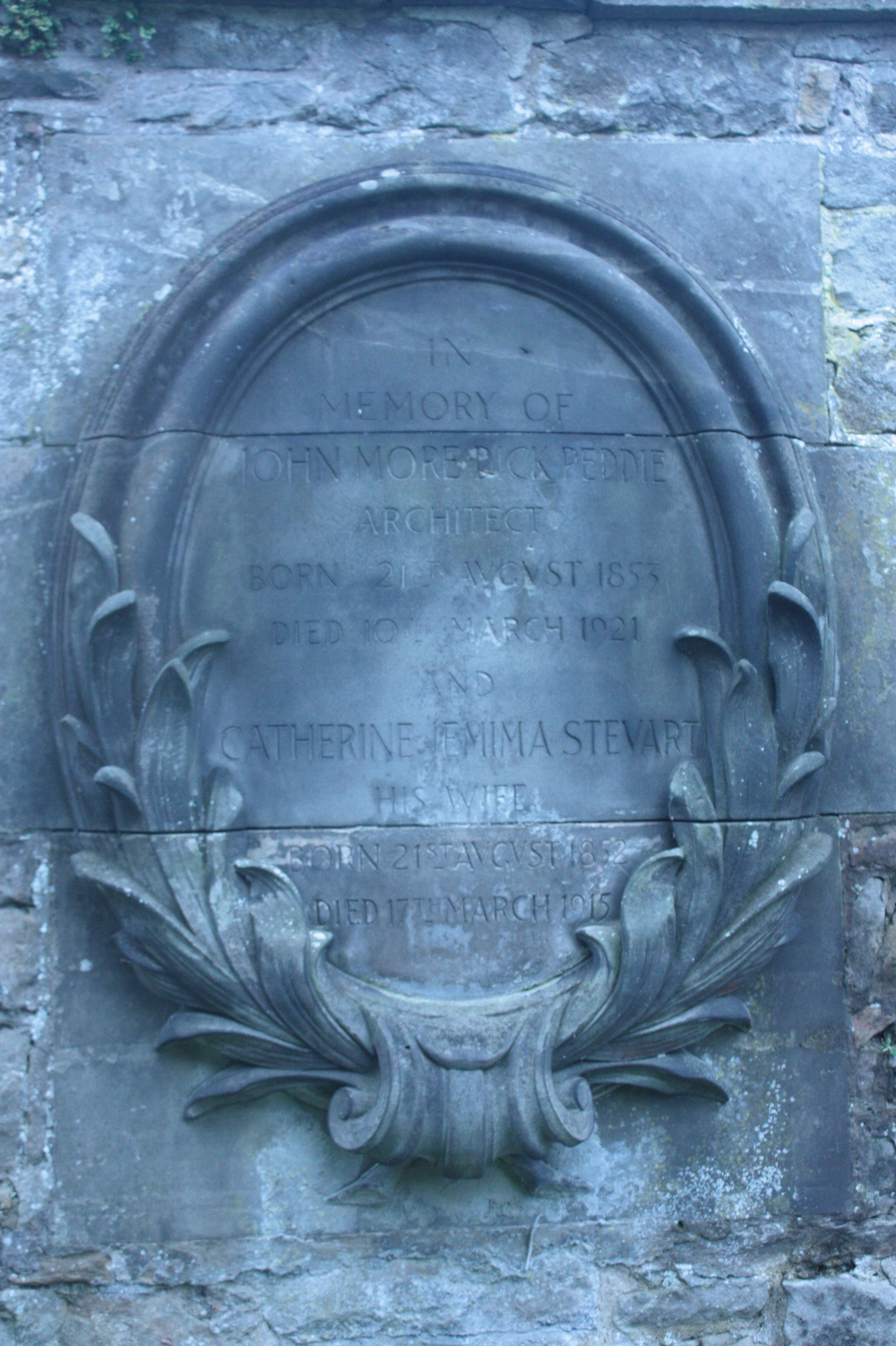
The grave of John More Dick Peddie, Dean Cemetery

John More Dick Peddie (21 August 1853 – 10 March 1921) was a British architect.

== Biography ==
Peddie was the son of the architect and politician John Dick Peddie (1824–1891) and his wife Euphemia Lockhart More. Born in Edinburgh, he attended Edinburgh Academy, followed by two years at a school in Elberfeld, Germany. He enrolled at the University of Edinburgh, and was also articled to his father's office. He then worked in the office of George Gilbert Scott, and later made a Grand Tour in Europe.

In 1875, he joined his father's firm, Peddie and Kinnear, and in 1878 became a partner. Peddie senior retired in 1879 and entered Parliament as Liberal MP for Kilmarnock Burghs. The practice became known as Kinnear and Peddie, with Charles Kinnear as senior partner. The Peddie family incurred substantial debts following the failure of some of John Dick Peddie's business interests, and fraud committed by his uncle. In 1878, the City of Glasgow Bank also collapsed, leading to recession in Scotland. However, the practice continued to find work, with J M Dick Peddie's designs including the Bank of Scotland's George Street branch (1883–1884). Kinnear worked on the practice's major schemes during the early 1880s, including Longmore Hospital and Craiglockhart Hydropathic, but in 1884 he became Colonel of the Midlothian Coast Artillery Volunteers, and his role in the firm reduced. He died suddenly in 1894, and within a year or two Peddie had taken on George Washington Browne (1853–1939), with whom he had worked informally for some time, as a partner. Further work on bank branches included several outlets of the British Linen Bank. The practice was very successful, and lasted formally to 1907. Peddie adopted a more Beaux-Arts style in his works over these years.

As much a businessman and office manager as an architect, Peddie held directorships with the Edinburgh Tramway Company, Scottish Equitable Life and the Scottish Investment Trust, but never sought membership of the Royal Institute of British Architects or the Royal Scottish Academy. His contribution to the design work of his practices is increasingly obscure after this point, with greater reliance placed on carefully selected junior designers, often recruited from the Edinburgh School of Applied Art, which became part of Edinburgh College of Art in 1907. These included his assistant James Forbes Smith, who Peddie took on as junior partner in 1909, an association which lasted until 1917, by which time the practice had limited work. In 1920, Peddie merged his practice with that of his former assistant William James Walker Todd and Sydney Houghton Miller, the new firm being named J M Dick Peddie & W J Walker Todd. Peddie retired towards the end of that year and died the following March.

He was buried at Dean Cemetery in Edinburgh, with his wife Catherine Jemima Stewart who predeceased him in 1915. The grave is in the north section against its south wall adjoining the original cemetery.
