= Airth =

Coordinates: 56.067°N 03.776°W

Airth: Scottish Gaelic: An Àird; Airth
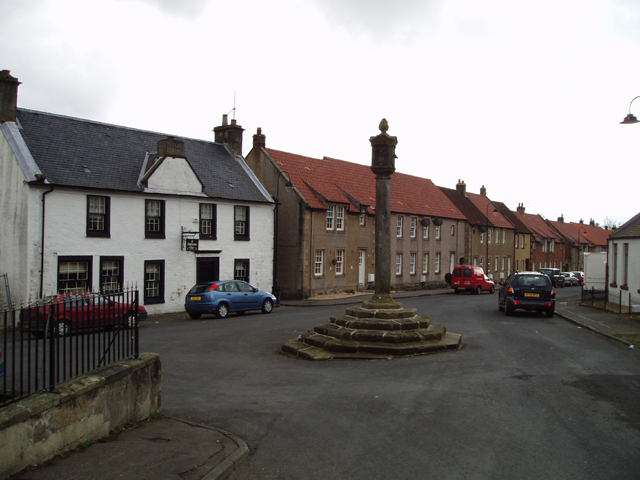
- The mercat cross at Airth

- Location within the Falkirk council area
- Area: 0.12 sq mi (0.31 km^{2})
- Population: 1,960 (2020)
  - Density: 16,333/sq mi (6,306/km^{2})
- OS grid reference: NS895875
  - Edinburgh: 24.0 mi (38.6 km) ESE
  - London: 349 mi (562 km) SSE
- Civil parish: Airth
- Council area: Falkirk
- Lieutenancy area: Stirling and Falkirk
- Country: Scotland
- Sovereign state: United Kingdom
- Post town: FALKIRK
- Postcode district: FK2
- Dialling code: 01324 83
- Police: Scotland
- Fire: Scottish
- Ambulance: Scottish
- UK Parliament: Falkirk
- Scottish Parliament: Falkirk East
- Website: falkirk.gov.uk

Airth (Scottish Gaelic: An Àird) is a Royal Burgh, village, former trading port and civil parish in Falkirk, Scotland. It is 6 miles (10 kilometres) north of Falkirk town and sits on the banks of the River Forth. Airth lies on the A905 road between Grangemouth and Stirling and is overlooked by Airth Castle; the village retains two market crosses and a small number of historic houses. At the time of the 2001 census the village had a population of 1,273 residents but this has been revised to 1,660 according to a 2008 estimate.

In July of each year it hosts a traditional Scottish Highland Games.

== History ==
The village has long association with the River Forth and it was on the banks of the river that a royal dockyard was created. In September 1506 Andrew Aytoun was paid for "casting of the dock in the Poll of Erth" for the ship. The dock was used during the years 1507–1513 in the reign of James IV to build ships of war at the pool of Airth. In 1511 and 1512 Robert Calendar made three docks, a stable for 50 horses, and a larger dock for the Margaret. Calendar's men also worked on the Lark and the James.

A form of dry dock may have been used. Strong timbers would be used to form the “stocks” for the vessel and a clay dam would prevent the river from penetrating the working area. When the ship was ready, the dam would be breached, at high tide, to enable it to float out into the river.

The shipping fleet was destroyed in 1745 by Bonnie Prince Charlie when some ship to shore skirmishes took place by batteries set by Jacobites to drive off the government ships. A number of smaller vessels from the village were burned by loyalist troops and that proved damaging to Airth's subsequent development as a port. However, as late as 1820 sloops built in the shipyards at Airth were among those recorded as operating in the middle of the Forth .

Dunmore Park and the Dunmore Pineapple is an historic estate in Airth, formerly the ancestral residence of the Earl of Dunmore.

The name Airth comes from the Gaelic term Àird meaning a height or hill after the nearby Hill of Airth.

== Notable residents ==
- Michelle Watt - (1977-2015), television show host and newspaper columnist

== See also ==
- List of places in Falkirk
- Airth Old Parish Church
- Airth Castle
