= Queens Moat Houses =

British public limited company

- Industry: Hotels
- Founder: John Bairstow
- Defunct: August 2, 2004
- Fate: Acquired by Goldman Sachs
- Headquarters: Britain
- Key people: David Howell, Non-exec Director; John Gale, Non-exec Director; Martin Marcus, Deputy Chairman; Steve Marshall, Chairman

Queens Moat Houses PLC was a British public limited company engaged primarily in the hotel business. By 1991, it had become the third-largest hotel operator in the United Kingdom. Trading in its shares was suspended in 1993 following an accounting scandal, and the company was subsequently investigated under the Companies Act 1985. It was acquired by Goldman Sachs in 2005 and renamed QMH Limited.

== History ==
Queens Moat House Hotels was founded in the early 1970s by John Bairstow. By 1991, the company was the third largest hotelier in the United Kingdom, after Forte Group and Mount Charlotte. On 31 March 1993, trading in its shares was suspended after an accounting scandal. The company was subsequently investigated under Section 432(2) of the Companies Act 1985. In 1997, the company sold 25 hotels. The company was bought by Goldman Sachs in August 2005 and renamed QMH Limited. In October 2005, 9 hotels were sold for approximately £100m. In February 2013, 20 German hotels were sold to Fattal Hotels, an Israeli company. In 2014, 11 hotels were sold to Marathon Asset Management.
