= Airth Old Parish Church =

Church in Falkirk, Scotland

Coordinates: 56.0618°N 3.7677°W

Airth Old Parish Church is a ruined church in the grounds of Airth Castle at Airth, in the Falkirk council area in Scotland.

The building is now without a roof. It dates from various periods, including substantial parts from the Romanesque period. The quire steeple and north aisle were added by John Milne, the royal master mason, in 1647. Access to the church is restricted for safety reasons. The graveyard includes a number of cast iron 'mortsafes', large coffin-shaped containers used to thwart the body snatchers in the early 19th century.

The church is designated as a scheduled monument by Historic Environment Scotland.
