= Strandby, British Columbia =

Strandby
- Location of Strandby in British Columbia
- Coordinates: 50°50′19″N 128°08′49″W
- Country: Canada
- Province: British Columbia
- Region: Vancouver Island
- Regional District: Mount Waddington

Strandby is adjacent to the mouth of the Strandby River at the west end of Shuttleworth Bight, near the northeastern extremity of Vancouver Island, British Columbia.

== Name origin ==
Cache Creek, the former name, derived from the stream, which, according to an 1892 report, afforded shelter at its mouth for craft drawing not more than 2.1 metres (7 ft). Historically, cache means something of value in a hidden location. One theory claims this referred to the creek itself, which enters the bight at such a sharp angle to be almost invisible from the sea. Furthermore, gold has been detected on the creek, foreshore, and Irony Creek, near the eastern end of the bay.

Another theory alludes to buried treasure. Once a month, early resident Daniel O'Connell would row his 4-metre (12 ft) boat to Shushartie for supplies, but allegedly paid with $20 gold pieces of unknown origin. He drowned on one such trip.

To avoid confusion with the other Cache Creek, the post office opened in 1911 as Strandby, which was Marie Shuttleworth's hometown in Denmark. Both names were used interchangeably for the settlement. Postmaster Skinner at Shushartie, who dropped off the Strandby mail monthly, jokingly called it "Stranded by the Sea". In due course, the stream was called Strandby River, but when officially renamed in 1947, it was misspelled Stranby. The error was detected by local historian Ruth Botel, and officially corrected in 2005.

== Early community ==
Danish settler Soren Christensen, who came in the late 1890s, resided at the mouth of the creek. East of the settlement was Burnt Hill, later renamed Soren Hill. His sister Marie joined him in 1903.

About 1905, Henry (Harry) Shuttleworth arrived, marrying Marie in 1908. He had previously spent the winter of 1896 placer mining for gold on the creek. In their new home, the couple extended hospitality to all travellers between Cape Scott and Shushartie. Their 20 or 30 head of cattle foraged the rainforest, and the descendants still roam wild. Their few domesticated cows provided milk, and Marie made butter and cheese. Harry was community leader and justice of the peace, and at various times served as road foreman and postmaster.

In 1910, a trail linking east to Shushartie was funded. To avoid travel by small launch in choppy waters, residents soon demanded an upgrade to a wagon road. Westward however, little more than a trail could ever become a reality.

Near Daniel O'Connell's place, Peter Wold lived on Burnt Hill, a name evidencing an earlier forest fire. Other permanent residents included Pete and Karl Sovik, the Gundersons, and the Eaglestads. In 1911, the Alec Sims and their twin babies came, soon followed by Harry Shuttleworth's brother Robert with his wife and five children. Robert's family temporarily lived in a new house by the creek before moving 3 kilometres (2 mi) west to Sunny Bay. J. Tom & Dorothy Lockwood and their three sons completed the year's arrivals. The family was musical, and Tom was an Anglican lay preacher. He took over the general store, and was postmaster 1913–1917. Later settlers were drawn by a land promotion on Burnt Hill, but the soil was poor, and the immigrants soon relocated to the fertile foreshore. From 1914, World War I enlistments decimated these communities.

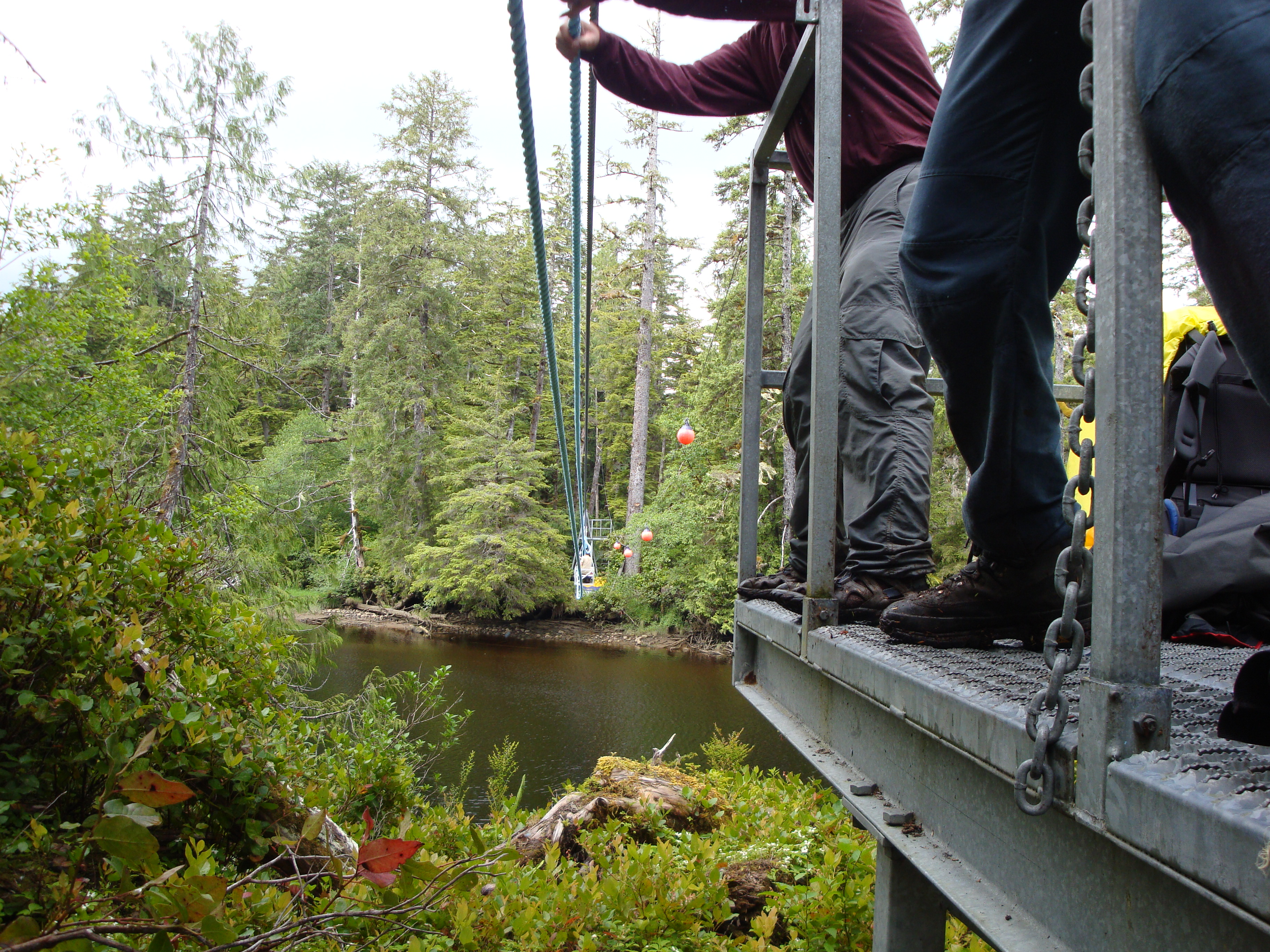
Strandby River cable crossing, 2009

The installation of government telephone lines along the trails connecting Holberg to Cape Scott, San Josef Bay, Sea Otter Cove and Shushartie was completed in 1915. Little evidence of this line through Strandby remains. That year, Soren Christensen died. The next year, Robert Shuttleworth left for New Westminster to work in a munitions factory. In 1917, the family joined him, promising to return in the spring, but like many, they never resettled after the war. By 1921, Harry & Marie Shuttleworth alone remained at Strandby. The Gundersons, Nockens, and Eaglestads were at Christensen Point, also named after Soren. Just inland from this western point of Sunny Bay lived the Dykes.

Outliving Marie, Henry (Harry) Shuttleworth, then the sole resident, died in 1941.

== Tourism ==
By the 1970s, apart from a shelter for the stranded, only collapsed abandoned buildings remained. The Cape Scott Provincial Park extends along the northern tip of Vancouver Island from Shushartie Bay in the east, then westward around Cape Scott and south to San Josef Bay. The individuals who once inhabited almost every cove have long gone.

Nowadays, the North Coast Trail, which links east to west, borders Shuttleworth Bight, where Strandby occupied the western end. Camping spots exist on the foreshore, and back in the forest when extreme winds. A house/lodge stands on the private property adjacent to the river mouth. To pass this obstacle, the trail skirts inland, crossing the river on a two-person aerial cable.
