= Scott Islands Marine National Wildlife Area =

National Wildlife Area in British Columbia, Canada

- IUCN category VI (protected area with sustainable use of natural resources)
- Location within British Columbia
- Location: Scott Islands, British Columbia
- Nearest city: Port Hardy
- Coordinates: 50°45′00″N 129°15′00″W
- Area: 11,570.65 km^{2} (4,467.45 sq mi)
- Designation: National Wildlife Area
- Designated: 2018
- Governing body: Canadian Wildlife Service

Scott Islands Marine National Wildlife Area is a National Wildlife Area off the northwestern tip of Vancouver Island in the Canadian province of British Columbia. Covering an area of 11,570.65 km^{2} (4,467.45 sq mi), it is the second largest protected area in British Columbia after Offshore Pacific Seamounts and Vents Closure and is the largest national wildlife area in Canada.

== Geography ==
The national wildlife area protects a large area of the Pacific Ocean and Queen Charlotte Sound surrounding Cape Scott and the Scott Islands. The islands themselves are already protected by the provincially-designated protected areas of Lanz and Cox Islands Provincial Park, Beresford Island Ecological Reserve, Sartine Island Ecological Reserve, and Anne Vallee Ecological Reserve. All fives islands span a distance of 11,570.65 km^{2} (4,467.45 sq mi), the islands extend 10–46 km offshore of Cape Scott. Elevation ranges from an altitude of 312–112 m.

Cox Island has an area of 9.78 km^{2} (3.78 sq mi) and has an elevation of 312 m (1,024 ft). Cox Island is the most eastern island of the five major Scott Islands. It has rugged, rocky shoreline with steep cliff faces and little to no vegetation.

Lanz Island has an area of 7.64 km^{2} (2.95 sq mi) and an elevation of 212 m (696 ft). Lanz Island is the second most eastern island and has similar geography to Cox Island, with the rugged shores and steep faces, only slightly smaller.

Beresford Island is the smallest of the five with an area of 0.15 km^{2} (0.058 sq mi). The island is dome-shaped with rocky sides and attached rocks with pinnacle geology.

Sartine Island has an area of 0.28 km^{2} (0.11 sq mi), with an elevation of 113 m (371 ft). The island has three associated islets: Little Sartine, First Sealion Rocks, and Second Sealion Rocks. Sartine Island and the three islets all have steep, rocky cliffs with windswept shores.

Triangle Island is the outermost island of the five. It has an area of 1.44 km^{2} (0.56 sq mi) and an elevation of 194 m (636 ft). Off the western point of Triangle Island there is a second island that is connected and visible at low tides, called Puffin Rock. Puffin Rock is 600 m (2,000 ft) in length with a 100 m (330 ft) elevation.

== Indigenous peoples ==
The Scott Islands Marine National Park resides on the historic territories of the Tlatlasikwala, Quatsino, Owekeeno, Heiltsuk, and Kwiakiutl First Nations. This area was used as traditional fishing, hunting, spiritual grounds for many years for these First Nations. These islands and surrounding waters also hold cultural and spiritual significance to them. In 2011, SOURCES Archeological & Heritage Research Inc. conducted a Traditional Knowledge and Use study on the Scott Islands area. They discovered 38 ethno-historic and 14 archeological sites that reflect the cultural and spiritual history of the area for these First Peoples.

The Marine National Park collaborates and consults with all First Nations having interest in the park including the Tlatlasikwala, Quatsino, Owekeeno, Heiltsuk, and Kwiakiutl First Nations. These collaborations work towards achieving mutually respectful resource and environmental management, planning, and stewardship for the park while upholding Indigenous Peoples rights, title, interest, and self-government in a respectful and understanding manner.

== Marine National Wildlife Area ==
The Scott Islands Marine National Park was established on June 27, 2018, and serves as Canada's first Marine Protected Area (MPA) and Marine National Wildlife Area (mNWA) under the Canada Wildlife Act. The planning and management of the mNWA is conducted by Environment and Climate Change Canada with collaborating efforts run with Fisheries and Oceans Canada, Canadian Coast Guard, Transport Canada, Natural Resources Canada, province of British Columbia, Tlatlasikwala First Nation, Quatsino First Nation as well as industry and environmental organizations.

This 11,570.65 km^{2} (4,467.45 sq mi) mNWA serves to protect the abundance of seabirds and marine life that heavily depend on these islands and waters for breeding, shelter, and feeding. This mNWA's main purpose is to protect wildlife and biodiversity against the high volumes of sea vessel traffic running through this area. The mNWA will help reduce the threats of visual disturbances, noise pollution, oil discharge/spills, collisions, and high risks of grey water posed by various bulk carriers, large passenger vessels like cruise ships, cargo ships as well as tanker traffic.

== Ecology ==
=== Flora ===
The waters surrounding the islands host kelp beds.

Each of the islands that are in the Scott Islands Marine National Wildlife Area has its own unique vegetation. There are five islands that are part of the Scott Islands there is different vegetation that is found on each of them. Kelp beds are found throughout the surrounding waters of all the islands.

Cox Island is the closest island to Vancouver Island. This island has trees, bushes, and a very limited amount of grass areas. The trees that are found on this island are Sitka spruce, western hemlock, and western redcedar. The bushes that are located on this island include salal and salmonberry. The second closest island is Lanz Island. Along with having the same trees and bushes as Cox Island, it also has twinberry, elderberry, and willows. Unlike Cox Island, Lanz island has a large amount of grass and forbs that is found around the forest.

The next island is Beresford Island. Unlike the two other islands, this island has much less vegetation that covers only a small part of the island, only about one third. This small amount of vegetation that is found includes Sitka spruce, grass and shrubbery. The fourth island is Sartine Island. There are no trees on this island, but there is grass and plants that are covering over half (60%). The final island of the Scott Islands is Triangle Island. This island has salmonberry and wild crabapple. Is also has grass and shrubs that populate in dispersed places on the island.

=== Fauna ===
The Scott Islands provide critical breeding and nesting habitat for 40% of British Columbia's seabirds. Bird species of note include tufted puffin, short-tailed albatross, black-footed albatross, Cassin's auklet, rhinoceros auklet, common murre, marbled murrelet, ancient murrelet, pink-footed shearwater, sooty shearwater, and bald eagle.

Resident mammal species include sea otter, northern sea lion, orca, humpback whale, and grey whale.

The Scott Islands provide critical breeding and nesting habitat for 40% of British Columbia's seabirds. The harsh winters make it difficult for animals to live on the islands from the months October to February. During the warmer time of the year, March to September, there is an abundance of diverse wildlife that takes up residence on the islands. Bird species of note include tufted puffin, short-tailed albatross, black-footed albatross, Cassin's auklet, rhinoceros auklet, common murre, marbled murrelet, ancient murrelet, pink-footed shearwater, sooty shearwater, and bald eagle. The abundance of zooplankton and small fish present around the islands attracts the seabirds.

In the water, the resident mammal species include sea otter, northern sea lion, orca, humpback whale, and grey whale. There are also many fish that are found in the waters around The Scott Islands. There are groundfish and five types of salmon. The species of groundfish that are found include rockfish, pacific halibut, lingcod, sablefish, Pacific hake, and sole. The five salmon are chinook, coho, chum, sockeye, and pink.

=== Species at risk ===
Under Canada's Species at Risk Act (SARA), 25 species that inhabit the mNWA (marine National Wildlife Area) are listed as being at risk, including eight species of migratory birds, eight marine mammals, two reptiles, and seven fish. Shoreline regions are used by Steller sea lions, who are classified as Special Concern under the SARA. Currently, BC is home to about 33% of all Steller sea lions in the Eastern Hemisphere. The Steller sea lion rookeries in the Scott Islands are the second-largest breeding group in the world and provide approximately 70% of the pups for the population of British Columbia.

==== Marine mammals ====
Sea otters, which are SARA's Special Concern species, are regaining their numbers and range. The population is not yet evidently secure, despite the fact that their numbers are growing again, and their range is spreading down the coast. One of only two regions in the Pacific North Coast Integrated Management Area (PNCIMA) where sea otters have established a resident population is the marine area surrounding the Scott Islands. The management strategy for sea otters developed by DFO (Fisheries and Oceans Canada) mentions that they are "especially vulnerable to oil accidents due to their vulnerability to oil and proximity to major oil tanker routes". Several species of endangered marine mammals are also known to inhabit the seas near the mNWA (marine National Wildlife Area). Such as the blue whale (SARA Endangered), the northern resident and Bigg's/transient ecotypes of killer whales (both SARA Threatened), the fin whale (Threatened), the grey whale (no status, under investigation), and the humpback whale (listed as Special Concern). Of them, the Scott Islands mNWA (marine National Wildlife Area) has been designated as the fin whale's key habitat.

==== Birds ====
The waters of the Scott Islands are also known to be used by a variety of endangered marine birds. These include the black-footed albatross (Special Concern), the marbled murrelet (Threatened), the short-tailed albatross (Threatened), the pink-footed shearwater (Threatened), and the ancient murrelet (Special Concern). Listed as Endangered under SARA are northern abalone, Marine algae (Percursaria dawsonii), great blue heron, Peale's peregrine falcon, fork-tailed storm petrel, pelagic cormorant, bald eagle, and black oystercatcher. Listed as Yellow under BC's provincial conservation status rank are Leach's storm petrel, fork-tailed storm petrel, pelagic cormorant.

=== Threats ===
==== Predatory and invasive species ====
One of the biggest hazards to nesting seabirds and a factor in the extinction of island bird species is the introduction of invasive and predatory species. The extirpation of Cassin's auklets and rhinoceros auklets is thought to have already taken place in the Scott Islands, where mink and raccoons were introduced to Lanz and Cox islands for the purpose of fur trapping in the 1930s. Periodically, fishermen have even abandoned domestic cats on the islands. The bird colonies on the Triangle, Sartine, and Beresford Islands are susceptible to the introduction of predators. In particular, rats that jump from ships or are dumped on the islands by broken-down boats or lost cargo pose a threat. The potential invasion of rats on these islands could have catastrophic effects on bird breeding populations.

==== Oil discharges and spills ====
Two of the major threats faced by commercial vessels within the Scott Islands mNWA are oily discharges and spills. These can take the shape of small-scale oil spills, large-scale oil spills, and unauthorized or illegal discharges of oily mixes. Aerial observation of oil discharges in the EEZ (Exclusive Economic Zone) on the Pacific coast found 101 discharges between 2008 and 2010, and northwest Vancouver Island was identified as a habitat vital to marine birds and perhaps at higher risk of oiling. Three of the 471 oiling incidents—or roughly 33 per year—that were discovered along BC's coast between 1997 and 2010 (according to another study) occurred close to the mNWA (marine National Wildlife Area).

Due to their higher frequency and greater geographic impact, it is thought that small-scale oil discharges (less than 1,000 litres) may have a bigger ecological impact per volume released than massive spills. The majority of these discharges, which are sometimes referred to as "chronic" oil pollution, are connected to bilge water, routine operating discharges, unlawful tank cleaning, and propeller shaft bearings. The waters near the Scott Islands are one of two areas on the BC coast with the highest potential risk from oil exposure due to the confluence of high bird density and high probability of small-scale oil discharges.

==== Greywater ====
Greywater, defined as the drainage from sinks, washers, bathtubs, showers, or dishwashers, can have pollution levels that are on par with raw sewage. It can transmit dangerous bacteria and diseases, endanger human health, contain a wide range of pollutants, increase the amount of nutrients in the nearby water, leading to eutrophication and oxygen-depleted dead zones. 116 Cruise ship traffic frequently sails between Beresford Island and the Lanz and Cox Islands through the Scott Islands. Greywater output on the BC coast was expected to be 1.54 billion litres per year in 2017, with vessels used for tourism, like as cruise ships and yachts, producing 1.37 billion litres of that total.

==== Shipping ====
The shelf break is an area where cold, nutrient-rich water rises from the seafloor, supporting food webs that attract whales and seabirds. The shelf break is an area of intense shipping traffic, especially for large bulk carriers, cargo ships, tankers and passenger vessels, which pose several threats including noise, physical disturbance, risk of spills and potential for collisions.

- The Scott Islands. Vessels transiting through or between the islands may cause visual disturbance and noise pollution, and potentially impact seabirds that are offshore. Vessels transiting the area may also impact the feeding ranges of sea otters and Steller sea lions.
- The Scott Channel runs between the southernmost Scott Islands and the north coast of Vancouver Island. It is an important area for seabirds, sea otters and Steller sea lions, and also receives a high volume of vessel traffic in the form of bulk carriers, container ships and passenger's vessels, much of which services communities in northwest Vancouver Island.
- The northeast corner of the Scott Islands marine NWA is an area of moderate to high densities of seabird populations and also an area of moderate to high density of vessel traffic, including large passenger vessels, smaller container ships, bulk carriers, and some tanker traffic.
- Deepwater offshore foraging areas, where large concentrations of sea birds congregate to forage.

== Tourist attractions ==
Within the Scott Islands there are two islands that are provincial parks, Lanz and Cox. These islands face harsh winters and tides which makes it difficult to get to. These two islands are the only ones that can be accessed by people who are not doing research.

== See also ==
- Cape Scott Provincial Park
