= San Josef Bay =

Bay in British Columbia, Canada

- Location of San Josef Bay in British Columbia
- Location: Vancouver Island, British Columbia
- Coordinates: 50°39′24″N 128°18′53″W
- Type: Bay
- River sources: San Josef River
- Ocean/sea sources: Pacific Ocean

San Josef Bay is a bay on the northwest coast of Vancouver Island, in the province of British Columbia, Canada.

It is located on the western coast of Vancouver Island between Cape Russell, or Hanna Point, and Cape Palmerston. The bay is about 15 km (9.3 mi) south of Cape Scott, the northwestern extremity of Vancouver Island, and about 34 km (21 mi) north of Quatsino Sound. The distance from San Josef Bay to Nanaimo is about 350 km (220 mi), and about 350 km (220 mi) to Victoria, and 350 km (220 mi) to Vancouver.

San Josef Bay is within the traditional territory of two First Nations, the Tlatlasikwala Nation, and the Quatsino First Nation.

== Name ==
The bay's name "San Josef" first appears on a 1793 chart made by the Spanish naval officer Dionisio Alcalá Galiano. In 1792 Galiano circumnavigated Vancouver Island with Cayetano Valdés y Flores and in cooperation with George Vancouver. The name refers to Saint Joseph, the husband of Mary, mother of Jesus. Unbeknownst to Galiano, the maritime fur trader James Hanna had named the bay St. Patrick's Bay during his second voyage to the area in 1786. Hanna also named the San Josef River "Parry River". Another maritime fur trader who visited in 1786, James Strange, named San Josef Bay "Scott’s Bay", after his friend and patron David Scott, who is commemorated by nearby Cape Scott and Scott Islands.

== Geography ==
Most of the San Josef Bay and much of the land around it is within Cape Scott Provincial Park. The San Josef River flows into the east end of San Josef Bay. Jensen Creek also empties into the bay very close to the mouth of the San Josef River. There are a number of small islands in San Josef Bay, including Kelley Island. Just west of Hanna Point are the Helen Islands and Winifred Islands.

Mount St. Patrick lies on the northern shore of San Josef Bay, just east of Sea Otter Cove.

Cape Scott Provincial Park can be accessed near the mouth of the San Josef River via a road from the community of Holberg, about 20 km (12 mi) east of San Josef Bay. Holberg is located at the end of Holberg Inlet, part of Quatsino Sound.

The Indian reserve "Semach 2", of the Kwakwakaʼwakw Tlatlasikwala Nation, associated with the Kwakiutl District Council, is located near Hanna Point and the entrance to Sea Otter Cove.

== History ==
Before Western contact in the late 18th century, the Cape Scott area was inhabited by three Kwakwakaʼwakw indigenous peoples, Nakomgilisala (Nakomgilisala), Koskimo and Quatsino. By the early 19th century the Yutlinuk of the nearby Scott Islands had ceased to exist as a separate people, with survivors merging with the Tlatlasikwala at the village of Nahwitti near Cape Sutil on the northeastern shore of Vancouver Island at the mouth of the Nahwitti River, and at the village of Humdaspe on Hope Island, and further south the Kwaguilth village of Tsaxis beside the Hudson's Bay Company outpost of Fort Rupert. In the mid-1850s the Tlatlasikwala and Nakumgilisala merged and moved to Hope Island, where they remained until 1954, at which time their population had dropped to just 32 individuals. In 1954 they joined with the Koskimo (Quatsino) people and moved to the Quatsino Sound area. Before 1985 they were known as the Nuwitti or Nahwitti, and today Tlatlasikwala.

The Koskimo and the Nakomgilisila were traditionally a closely related group of families (namima) of one tribe prior to contact. Both groups have tribal ancestor origin stories for areas around Nels Bight and the mouth of the Strandby River just west of Cape Scott at an ancient village known as Kosaa. The Koskimo moved south to Quatsino Sound during proto-historic times or very early in the maritime fur trade period. The San Josef Bay area was traditionally Quatsino territory with Quatsino origin stories naming San Josef Bay as a place where their ancestors first emerged. By the later 19th century, the Semach Indian Reserve was created in Sea Otter Cove for the Nahwitti tribe who assuredly were using this site due to their connections to the Nakomgilisila tribe.

The area was visited by two of the first maritime fur traders, who were among the earliest Western visitors to the Pacific Northwest coast after Captain James Cook. The first maritime fur trading ship captain to visit the coast, James Hanna, traded for sea otter furs at Nootka Sound in 1785 and made a considerable profit. His backers funded a second voyage in 1786, but when Hanna arrived at Nootka Sound he discovered that a second maritime fur trader, James Strange, had already been there and collected most of the sea otter furs available. So Hanna sailed Sea Otter north, in the process finding San Josef Bay. He named it St. Patrick's Bay. This name survives as the name of Mount St. Patrick on the northern shore of the bay. Hanna also gave Sea Otter Cove its present name, after his ship Sea Otter.

James Strange also sailed north from Nootka Sound, finding San Josef Bay as well and naming it Scott's Bay, a name which survives in some nearby place names, such as Cape Scott. By the 1790s, as the maritime fur trade boomed, indigenous peoples of the Pacific Northwest Coast focused the trade to certain places by bringing sea otter furs from a large area to a central trading site. For the San Josef Bay area, which was Kwakwakaʼwakw territory, this trading site was Nahwitti, around Cape Scott on the northernmost coast of Vancouver Island. Nahwitti was under the control of the Kwakwakaʼwakw Tlatlasikwala Nation.

San Josef Bay, and nearby areas like Sea Otter Cove, were prime sea otter habitat. By the early 19th century sea otters had been hunted to local extinction.
