= Lanz and Cox Islands Provincial Park =

Provincial park in British Columbia, Canada

- IUCN category II (national park)
- Location within British Columbia
- Interactive map of Lanz and Cox Islands Provincial Park
- Location: Scott Islands, British Columbia, Canada
- Nearest city: Port Hardy
- Coordinates: 50°48′30″N 128°40′00″W
- Area: 5,556 ha (21.45 sq mi)
- Established: July 12, 1995
- Governing body: BC Parks

Lanz and Cox Islands Provincial Park (formerly Scott Islands Marine Provincial Park) is a provincial park in British Columbia, Canada. It is located off Cape Scott on northern Vancouver Island.

== See also ==
- Triangle Island, one of the other Scott Islands
- Scott Islands Marine National Wildlife Area
