= Shushartie =

Coordinates: 50°51′15″N 127°51′15″W

Shushartie is a ghost town on the east shore of Shushartie Bay near the northeastern extremity of Vancouver Island, British Columbia.

== Name origin ==
The settlement adopted the name of the bay, which the Hudson's Bay Company conferred in 1838, while trading with First Nations. The name is an adaptation of a Kwakwaka'wakw word meaning "place possessing cockles". Shellfish abound on the extensive tidal flat at the head of the bay. In 1894, Rev. William Washington Bolton led an expedition from near Shushartie, across the northern parts to Quatsino Sound, and then south to Great Central Lake.

== Former community ==
In late 1894, six pioneers established a settlement known as the Canadian Co-operative Commonwealth. Four men lived in a log cabin, and a couple resided a little farther down the bay. More settlers were expected in the spring. A rockslide pushed the cabin about 30 metres (100 ft) into the bay. Three escaped with severe bruising, but Harry Kipling's leg was trapped beneath logs. To avoid drowning in the rising tide, Kipling consented to the amputation of his leg with an axe. He died the following afternoon. The missionary steamer Evangelist conveyed the survivors and Kipling's remains to Alert Bay, for passage on the Princess Louise to Victoria.

In the winter of 1902/03, the Boscowitz was towing the Methodist steamer Glad Tidings, when a bad leak added to engine troubles. The latter was beached at Shushartie for the storekeeper to pump out and make seaworthy, before collection on the former's next trip. In the interim, a fierce storm drove the Glad Tidings onto the rocks, where the unsalvageable wreck rested for years.

Jephther J. Skinner, the inaugural postmaster, served 1910–1934, a role commonly performed by a storeowner in such places. Among other enterprises, he ran a hotel, which opened in the early 1910s, and operated at least until 1930. The facility included longer term boarders.

In 1914, Skinner took over the Shushartie–Fisherman's Bay mail run, his series of boats manufactured by the local joinery. Before relocating his shipping route to the west coast, Captain Peterson performed the contract. Skinner named few of his boats, because he was often shipwrecked in the rough seas while completing the monthly route. He once said: "We are on the right Island, but on the wrong end and 50 years too soon." He died ashore in 1934, but had specified a burial at sea, because he had evaded the ocean's attempts to take him many times.

The community population was 25 in 1918, 50 in 1927, 65 in 1930, 48 in 1939, 31 in 1940, and 62 in 1943.

When the post office closed in 1952, the general store likely closed at the same time. Over recent decades, the abandoned buildings within the community have collapsed among the tangle of blackberry vines.

== Industry ==
=== Fishing ===
the Goletas Fish Co. operated a cannery 1914–1928. In 1923, Western Packers Ltd., then the Canadian Fishing Co., purchased the venture. On closure, the equipment moved to the Bones Bay Cannery.

The facility promoted the local salmon and halibut fishing industry. The cannery had its own general store for part of this time.

The presence of a fish buyer, at least from the mid-1930s to the late 1940s, indicates that fishing boats sold their coastal catches in the bay.

=== Forestry ===
Logging commenced as early as 1907. A sawmill/joinery operated from the early 1910s until the early 1950s. Logging continued in the area at least until the early 1960s.

=== Tourism ===
Nowadays, boat or floatplane provides the only eastern access to the North Coast Trail. During the summertime, a water taxi service operates from Port Hardy to the trailhead on the western side of Shushartie Bay. The Cape Scott Provincial Park extends along the northern tip of Vancouver Island from Shushartie Bay in the east, then westward around Cape Scott and south to San Josef Bay.
