= Pacific North Coast Integrated Management Area =

The Pacific North Coast Integrated Management Area (PNCIMA: pronounced pin-SEE-ma) is one of five Large Ocean Management Areas (LOMAs), areas of high ecological, social and economic importance, that have been identified by Fisheries and Oceans Canada (DFO) as priority regions for marine planning as part of Canada’s Oceans Action Plan.

After years of work by conservation groups, the fishing sector, tourism outfitters, First Nations, scientists and coastal residents, the Government of Canada finally embarked on the PNCIMA marine planning process in 2010. The goal was to develop a plan to conserve this relatively undeveloped region, while fostering sustainable economies on the coast, which promised to make Canada a world leader in marine conservation.

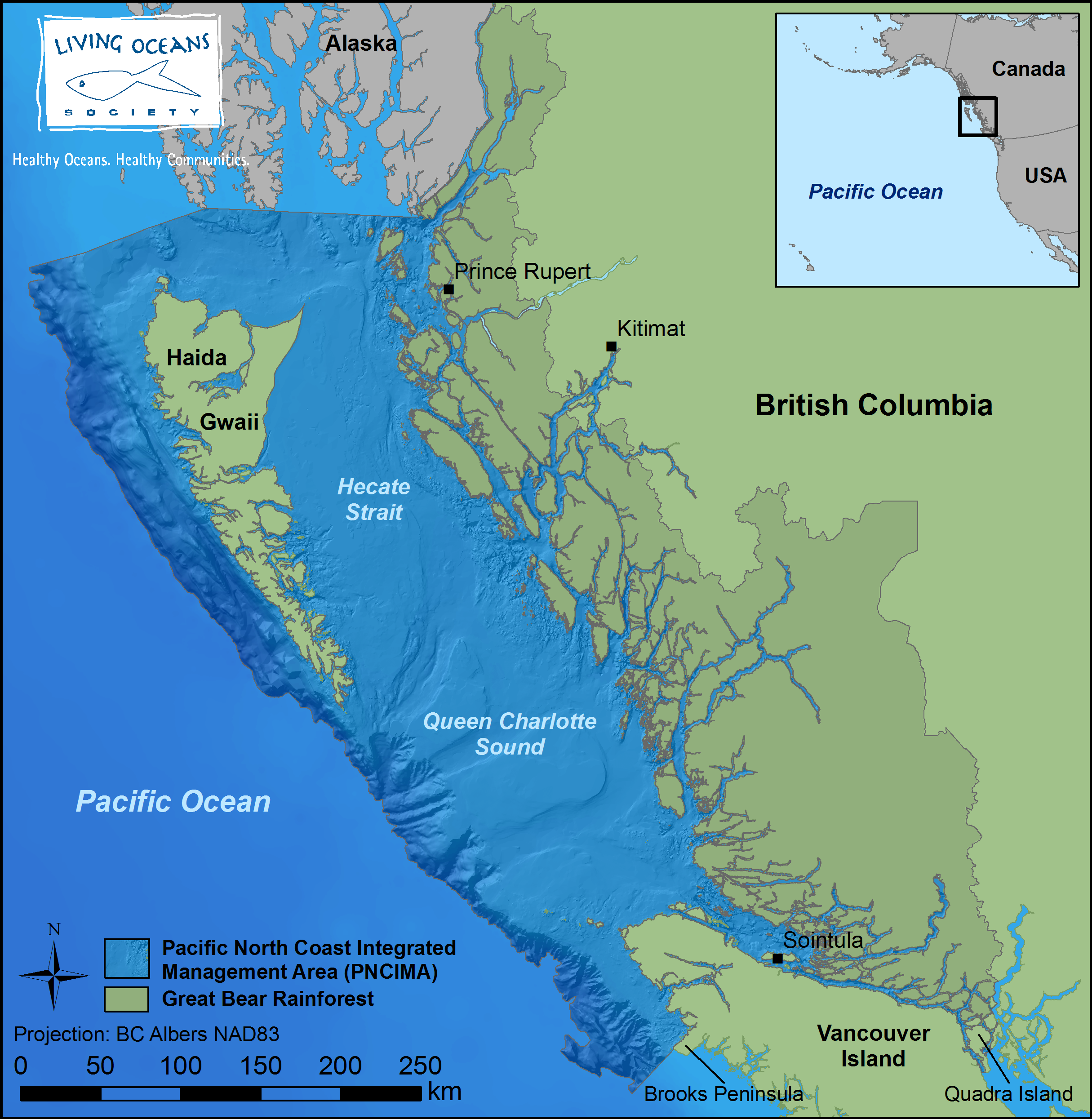
The Pacific North Coast Integrated Management Area encompasses approximately 88,000 km^{2}. and supports an abundance of marine life.

The purpose of the PNCIMA planning process is to ensure a healthy, safe, and prosperous ocean area by engaging all interested parties in the collaborative development and implementation of an integrated management plan. The goals of the PNCIMA initiative include: healthy and resilient ecosystems, reduced inter-user conflicts, sustainable economies, and thriving coastal communities with strong cultural and economic ties to coastal and marine areas.

In September 2011 however, the federal government withdrew from an agreement that provided funding to support the PNCIMA process. They stated that the process was being “realigned” to better fit with timelines and to be consistent with ocean planning on the other coasts of Canada. Under this streamlined plan, funding for public consultation and independent science was no longer required.

== Geographic extent ==
PNCIMA is in the Northern Shelf Ecoregion of British Columbia's Pacific North Coast. The geographic boundaries of PNCIMA extend from the outer limit of the foot of the continental slope in the west to the coastal watersheds in the east, and from the Canada–US border with Alaska in the north to the Brooks Peninsula on northwest Vancouver Island and Quadra Island in the south.

== Marine protected areas ==
A network of marine protected areas will be designed along with areas designated for other specific uses that contribute to the rebuilding of the ocean's health while minimizing economic impacts on fishermen. New management objectives will be developed to ensure there are healthy habitats and clean waters for all the species that call this place home. This will provide fisheries that sustain native and non native communities.

Only 1.98 percent (8963.58 km^{2}) of Canada’s Pacific waters are currently protected in federal and provincial marine protected areas (MPAs).

In Canada, marine protection can be established under any number of federal legislation including:

- Oceans Act
- Fisheries Act
- National Parks Act
- National Marine Conservation Areas Act
- Canadian Wildlife Act

In British Columbia, marine protection can be established under the Park Act and the Ecological Reserves Act .

These are the different types of marine protection found within PNCIMA. These include Gwaii Haanas National Marine Conservation Area Reserve and Haida Heritage Site and Scott Islands marine National Wildlife Area, as well as the following.

=== Sponge reef fishery closures ===
Sponge reefs are highly sensitive to disturbance and the ones in PNCIMA were thought to be extinct until their discovery in 1987. Fisheries closures are for the groundfish and shrimp trawl. In June 2010, the Minister of Fisheries and Oceans announced the government's intention to pursue marine protection measures for the glass sponge reefs of Hecate Strait and Queen Charlotte Sound.

=== Rockfish conservation areas ===
Rockfish conservation areas are intended to protect rockfish so fishing activities within these areas is restricted. There are 192 rockfish conservation areas in British Columbia, and 79 of those are within PNCIMA.

=== British Columbia parks and ecological reserves ===
Dr. Michael Bigg Ecological Reserve

== History ==
- December 12, 2008 Coastal First Nations and Fisheries and Oceans Canada (DFO) signed a Memorandum of Understanding (MOU) that formally started marine planning in PNCIMA. The MoU was not signed by the British Columbia government at that time because provincial agencies and departments were unable to agree on an approach. The Province is currently participating in the PNCIMA process as observers. Because the provincial government has jurisdiction over the seafloor, foreshore and licensing, the British Columbia government’s full participation will eventually be required in order for the PNCIMA process to be successful.
- March 2009 the first PNCIMA Forum was held in Vancouver, British Columbia. This forum brought together over three hundred people – including representatives from all levels of government, First Nations, coastal communities, marine industries and non-governmental organizations.
- May 2010 the PNCIMA initiative released an Engagement Strategy that lays out how the people and industries within PNCIMA can get involved in the process.
- June 2010 formation of the Integrated Oceans Advisory Committee (IOAC), a stakeholder table that will act in an advisory capacity to the government and First Nations Steering Committee.
- September 2011 the federal government withdrew from an agreement which provided funding for independent science and administrative support for the PNCIMA process.

== Policy and legislation ==
- Canada's Oceans Act
- Canada's Oceans Strategy
- Canada's Ocean Action Plan

== Reports ==
Lucas, B.G., Verrin, S., and Brown, R. (Editors). 2007. Ecosystem overview: Pacific North Coast Integrated Management Area (PNCIMA). Can. Tech. Rep. Fish. Aquat. Sci. 2667: xiii + 104 p.

Clarke, C.L., and Jamieson, G.S. 2006. Identification of ecologically and biologically significant areas in the Pacific North Coast Integrated Management Area: Phase I – Identification of important areas. Can. Tech. Rep. Fish. Aquat. Sci. 2678: vi +89 p.

Clarke, C.L., and Jamieson, G.S. 2006. Identification of ecologically and biologically significant areas in the Pacific North Coast Integrated Management Area: Phase II – Final Report. Can. Tech. Rep. Fish. Aquat. Sci. 2686: v + 25 p.

MacConnachie, S., Hillier, J., and Butterfield, S. 2007. Marine Use Analysis for the Pacific North Coast Integrated Management Area. Can. Tech. Rep. Fish. Aquat. Sci 2677: viii + 188 p.

Johannessen, D.I., Macdonald, J.S., Harris, K.A., and Ross, P.S. 2007. Marine environmental quality in the Pacific North Coast Integrated Management Area (PNCIMA), British Columbia, Canada: A summary of contaminant sources, types and risks. Can. Tech. Rep. Fish. Aquat. Sci. 2716: xi + 53 p.

David Suzuki Foundation. 2009. Marine and Coastal Ecosystem Services: A report on ecosystem servides in the Pacific North Coast Integrated Management Area (Pncima) on the British Columbia coast.

David Suzuki Foundation. 2008. B.C.’s Bountiful Sea: Heritage Worth Preserving
