= James Charles Stuart Strange =

British politician (1753–1840)

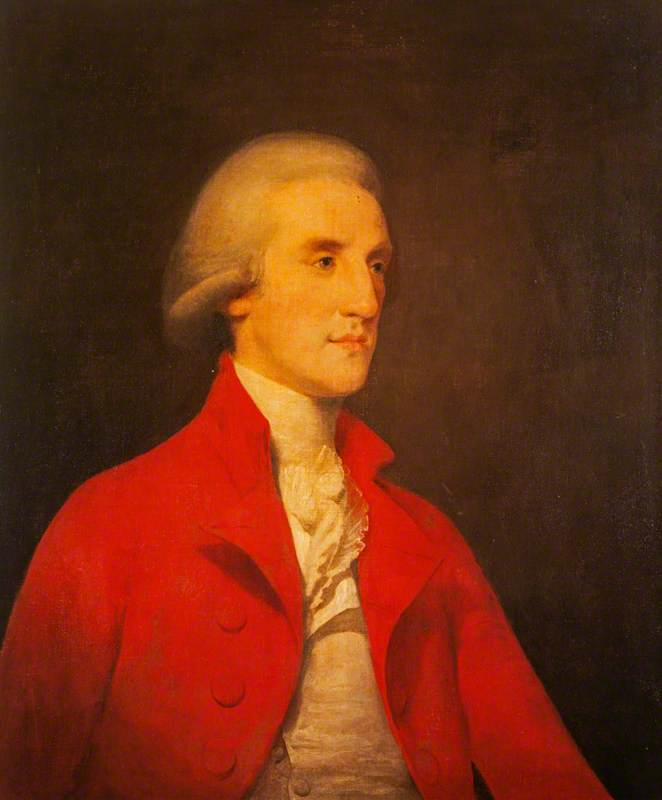
- Born: 8 August 1753; London, England
- Died: 6 October 1840 (aged 87); Airth Castle, Airth, Lanarkshire, Scotland
- Occupations: East India Company, Maritime fur trader, MP of Parliament of Great Britain
- Spouse(s): (1) Margaret Durham (died 1791) (2) Anne Dundas
- Parent(s): Robert Strange and Isabella Lumisden

James Charles Stuart Strange (8 August 1753 – 6 October 1840) was a British officer of the East India Company, one of the first maritime fur traders, a banker, and a Member of Parliament.

== Background and education ==
James Charles Stuart Strange was born on 8 August 1753 in London, England, United Kingdom. His parents were Robert Strange and Isabella Lumisden.

His father, Robert Strange, was a former Jacobite from Orkney and had fought in the Jacobite rising of 1745, under Charles Edward Stuart, known as "Bonnie Prince Charlie" and the "Young Pretender". Robert Strange named his son James Charles Stuart Strange after Bonnie Prince Charlie, who was also James' godfather.

Robert and Isabella Strange moved to London in 1750. A few years later James Charles Stuart Strange was born. James attended the College of Navarre in Paris in 1770.

== East India Company ==
In 1772 James Strange obtained a writership with the East India Company (EIC), in Madras, India. He gained this post through Sir Lawrence Dundas, a relative of Strange's maternal grandmother. Like many members of former Jacobite families, James Strange and his brother Thomas Strange made their way to India, arriving in 1773. James advanced rapidly in the EIC and in private trade. In 1778 he became a Factor of the EIC.

In 1780 Strange returned to England, having made a fortune. He was promoted to a Junior Merchant of the EIC in 1782. On 18 February 1785 Strange married Margaret Durham. The same year he returned to India with his new bride.

From late 1785 to early 1787 he undertook a voyage to the Pacific Northwest Coast, hoping to be the first to capitalize on the nascent maritime fur trade. Afterward he returned to India and continued his career with the EIC. He was promoted to Senior Merchant in 1790. In 1795 he was appointed Collector and Paymaster for the EIC in Tanjore, India. Later that year he retired from the East India Company and returned to England.

Later he rejoined the EIC and became Magistrate Collector in Puducherry (Pondichery), in 1806, then Judge of Court of Appeal, in 1807. From 1813 to 1815 he served the EIC as Postmaster General and a Senior Member of the Board of Trade. In 1816 he retired and returned to Great Britain. On the voyage home he stopped at Saint Helena where he won a game of piquet with the exiled Napoleon.

== Voyage to the Pacific Northwest ==
In 1785 while returning to India after marrying Margaret Durham, Strange read newly published accounts of the third voyage of Captain Cook, including news of the large profits made by his crew in Guangzhou (Canton), China, selling sea otter furs they had obtained at Nootka Sound on the Pacific Northwest Coast. Captain James King, who had helped take over after the death of Cook, wrote of the possible profits to be made selling Northwest Coast furs in China.

Upon Strange's return to India and the East India Company (EIC) in later 1785, he discussed the idea of an expedition with David Scott, a prominent Mumbai (Bombay) merchant. Scott and his two partners, Tate and Adamson, obtained the support of the president and council of the East India Company in Bombay for an expedition of two ships from Mumbai (Bombay) to the Northwest Coast of America. Strange invested 10,000 pounds in the venture, which he borrowed from David Scott. Overall the cost of fitting out the expedition rose to the point where only a major success in fur trading could possibly pay back investments, let alone make a profit.

Two Bombay-built, copper-hulled snows were purchased. They were the Captain Cook of 350 tons, and the Experiment of 100 tons. The Captain Cook was commanded by Henry Laurie, and the Experiment by Henry Guise. Strange was supercargo and also in overall command of the voyage. As far as the EIC was concerned, Strange was a company servant in command of a company-sanctioned, private project that, it was hoped, would lead not only to the discovery of new channels of commerce but also forestall rival attempts.

Strange's instructions from the East India Company described two main purposes for the expedition. First, exploration for the benefit of navigation. This included instructions to return via Bering Strait, the Arctic Ocean as far as the North Pole, then Kamchatka, then China. Second, the establishment of a new channel of commerce from the Pacific Northwest Coast to China and India. Despite these instructions, the actual voyage was a commercial fur-trading venture no different from other early maritime fur trading expeditions to the Northwest Coast.

Strange's expedition left Bombay in December, 1785. Unable to acquire goods on the Malabar Coast for trade in Macau, Strange sailed directly for the Pacific Northwest. The Experiment was holed while still in the Indian Ocean, forcing a stop at Batavia (now Jakarta) for repairs, costing time and money.

After a seven-month voyage the expedition arrived on the coast of Vancouver Island on 25 June 1786, late in the trading season. On the 28th Strange entered Nootka Sound, but not the way he intended. It took nine more days to reach Yuquot, which was where Captain Cook had anchored. Strange named the harbor at Yuquot "Friendly Cove", a name which persisted for a long time. He spent about a month trading for furs around Nootka Sound with the native Nuu-chah-nulth. Strange conducted the trading negotiations himself and, like other traders, found the Nuu-chah-nulth very shrewd traders.

Beyond trading negotiations, Strange did not interact with the natives very much. Alexander Walker, an ensign of the Bombay Army and later Governor of Saint Helena, who had shipped aboard the Experiment, spent a great deal of time with the Nuu-chah-nulth. He had studied the language based on Cook's vocabularies, and was able to talk with the Nuu-chah-nulth. He was astonished to learn that the British fur trader James Hanna had been at Nootka Sound a year before. Up until then Strange and his crew thought themselves the first fur traders on the Northwest Coast. Walker wrote favorably of chiefs Maquinna and Callicum, who later came to figure prominently in the Nootka Crisis. Both Walker and Strange were confused about the rank of Maquinna and Callicum and generally about the Nuu-chah-nulth's system of social hierarchy. Maquinna was the highest ranked chief of the highest ranked house, while Callicum was the leading chief of the second ranking house. The visitors did not understand these things. Walker and Strange both showed preference to Callicum, and Strange made the mistake of giving gifts to Callicum before Maquinna. These things offended Maquinna and caused tension and uneasiness, which Walker failed to understand. Still, Walker's descriptions of the Nuu-chah-nulth are valuable as the earliest detailed documentation, other than Captain Cook's 1778 journal, since no first-hand account of Hanna's 1785 stay at Nootka Sound survives.

Strange had been instructed to establish a trading relationship with the natives. To this end he left John Mackay, assistant surgeon of the Experiment, at Nootka Sound. Strange hoped to make a second expedition, which would benefit from Mackay's time at Nootka Sound, but a second expedition never happened. Mackay remained with Maquinna's Nuu-chah-nulth for about a year. At first Mackay was quite satisfied, but one day he accidentally broke a taboo that earned him the wrath of Maquinna, after which Mackay was poorly treated and spent a miserable winter. In June 1787 Charles William Barkley arrived at Friendly Cove in the Imperial Eagle. Mackay helped Barkley gain 700 sea otter pelts from the Nuu-chah-nulth. In August another maritime fur trader, George Dixon, arrived in the King George. Mackay, eager to leave, shipped out with Dixon.

Leaving Mackay behind, Strange left Nootka Sound in late July, 1786, sailing north. He stopped near the northern end of Vancouver Island, which he named Cape Scott, after David Scott, his patron in Mumbai (Bombay). He found and named the Scott Islands. He found San Josef Bay and named it Scott's Bay, also after his patron, but in that case his name did not survive to the present day. Strange explored the waters north of Vancouver Island, which he named Queen Charlotte Sound. Contact was made with a group of Kwakwaka'wakw off the north coast of Vancouver Continuing east and south around Vancouver Island Strange noted the more constricted waters of Queen Charlotte Strait. Strange's discovery of Queen Charlotte Strait revived speculation about Bartolome de Fonte's alleged Northwest Passage. Strange himself thought he had found the entrance to the fabled strait, but fur trading took priority and he did not investigate. Furs were not plentiful in this area, so Strange sailed north, making for Prince William Sound in Alaska, as Cook had done.

On the way north land was sighted, probably Haida Gwaii, but Strange kept far to sea and passed by. On 29 August 1786, Cape Hinchinbrook, the entrance to Prince William Sound, was sighted. The two ships entered and sailed to Snug Corner Cove, where Cook had anchored. They stayed for about two weeks, until 16 September. Strange tried to acquire furs but it was late in the season and there was little to be had. Additionally, the natives were far less enthusiastic about trade than the Nuu-chah-nulth.

While at Prince William Sound Strange was joined by William Tipping of the Sea Otter. After their encounter, Tipping's Sea Otter was never seen again. It might have been attacked and destroyed, or it might have been lost at sea.

In September 1786, Strange left Prince William Sound and sailed to Canton, China. He sold his furs for about £5,600, which was not nearly enough to cover the expenses of the expedition, nor even his own personal investment. Although his venture was a financial disaster, Strange was one of the first trader-explorers working on Pacific Northwest Coast, along with James Hanna, Charles William Barkley, and George Dixon.

== Political career ==
In 1796 James Strange, a Whig, became a Member of Parliament (MP) as a guest of John Sackville, 3rd Duke of Dorset, a silent supporter of William Pitt's administration. Strange's constituency was East Grinstead.

In 1802 Strange was elected as MP of Okehampton, having been recommended to the patron Henry Holland by James Strange's father-in-law Henry Dundas. Strange survived a challenge to his election by two wealthy London merchants. Strange was an inconspicuous MP, speaking only once, arguing against severity toward James Trotter, an election offender.

== Banking ==
After retiring from the East India Company in 1795 Strange became a partner in the bank of Strange, Dashwood & Company, of New Bond Street, London. In 1803 Strange's bank failed, which left him impoverished and caused him to return to India, where his brother Sir Thomas Andrew Lumisden Strange helped James acquire employment with the East India Company.

== Personal life ==
James Strange's first marriage, in 1785, was to Margaret Durham, the daughter of James Durham of Largo, Fife, Scotland. Margaret's brother was Philip Charles Durham, later Admiral Sir Philip Charles Calderwood Henderson Durham of the Royal Navy. They had one daughter, Isabella Katherine Strange (1785–1847). Margaret died in 1791.

In 1798 Strange married Anne Dundas, the daughter of Henry Dundas, 1st Viscount Melville, and widow of Henry Drummond, an English banker and politician. They had three daughters: Mary Anne Strange (c. 1806–1889), Louisa Strange (1810–1895), and Isabella Strange (1816–1879).

In 1816, after his second time in India working for the EIC, Strange retired to Scotland.

After a five-month illness, James Strange died on 7 October 1840 at Airth Castle, Airth, Lanarkshire, Scotland.

== Legacy ==
Several places in British Columbia were named for James Strange, including Strange Island, in Nootka Sound, and Strange Rock, near Cape Scott, Guise Bay, and Lowrie Bay. Other places are named for Strange's captains, Guise and Lowrie, and his ships, Captain Cook and Experiment. For example, near Cape Scott at the north end of Vancouver Island, Experiment Bight, and Guise Bay. And in Fitz Hugh Sound, Guise Point, and Experiment Point.

A fictional account of Strange, portrayed by Jonathan Pryce, appears in the television show Taboo on BBC One and FX.

== See also ==
- List of ships in British Columbia
