= Vancouver Island Trail =

800 km hiking trail in British Columbia

- Length: 800 km (497 mi)
- Location: British Columbia, Canada
- Trailheads: Anderson Hill, Oak Bay (southern terminus, 48.4127°N 123.3059°W); Cape Scott (northern terminus, 50.7824°N 128.4274°W)
- Use: Hiking

The Vancouver Island Trail (formerly also known as the Vancouver Island Spine Trail) is a near-completed 800 km-long hiking trail stretching the length of Vancouver Island, from its southern terminus on Anderson Hill in Oak Bay, to its northern terminus in Cape Scott Provincial Park. The trail connects to various communities including Victoria, Lake Cowichan, Port Alberni and Cumberland, and connects along existing trails the Galloping Goose Regional Trail, Cowichan Valley Trail, Alberni Inlet Trail, the Great Trail and the North Coast Trail.

The trail is intended to be accessible to hikers five months of the year, with some sections available much longer. Aside from hiking, few sections of the trail are currently available for non-motorized trail users, such as bicycles or horse riders. The first thru-hiker completed the Vancouver Island Trail in July 2018, and as of 2023, 22 people are estimated to have hiked the trail. It is estimated that thru-hiking the trail could take approximately 7 weeks. As of 2021 there are 740 km of the trail completed, with 60 km left.

The hiking trail project is being built and maintained by the non-profit Vancouver Island Trail Association (VITA). VITA is a part of 'Hike BC', the British Columbia wing of the National Hiking Trail (NHT).
