= Triangle Island =

Island in British Columbia, Canada

Coordinates: 50.864°N 129.082°W

Triangle Island is a small island, approximately 119 hectares (290 acres) in area, located off the northwestern tip of Vancouver Island, British Columbia, Canada. It is situated approximately 45 kilometres (28 miles) from Vancouver Island and 10 kilometres (6.2 miles) from Sartine Island, Triangle Island's nearest neighbour in the Scott Islands group. The island is notable for being the location of British Columbia's largest seabird colony, hosting such species as the Cassin's auklet and the tufted puffin. The Cassin's auklet population is the world's largest. It is the westernmost and most remote island in British Columbia, save for Haida Gwaii, which is off the coast of northern British Columbia. The island takes its name from its triangular appearance on sea navigation charts.

A lighthouse existed on the island from 1909 to 1919 but was abandoned due to severe fog, regular hurricane-force winds, and conditions utterly repellent to human habitation. The island is otherwise uninhabited, aside from a small cabin for research use. In 2004, the lantern room from the lighthouse was moved to the Sooke Region Museum, though the base remains on Triangle Island.

The island was the site of ancient First Nations hunting and egg-collecting activities.

Access to the island is tightly regulated and requires a permit from the British Columbia Ministry of Environment. The island is protected by the province as the Anne Vallée Triangle Island Ecological Reserve, named after a researcher who frequented the island and died there in an accident in 1982. Since 2018, Environment and Climate Change Canada has designated the Scott Islands and their adjacent waters a marine National Wildlife Area under the Canada Wildlife Act.

== See also ==
- Lanz and Cox Islands Provincial Park, two of the other Scott Islands
