= James Hanna (trader) =

James Hanna (died 1787) was the first European to sail to the Pacific Northwest to trade in furs. This maritime fur trade was an important factor in the early history of the Pacific Northwest and the westward expansion of the United States and Canada.

== The Northwest Coast fur trade ==
In December 1780, the ships of James Cook's third expedition, HMS Resolution and HMS Discovery, called at Canton (modern Guangzhou) on their return voyage from the North Pacific. While there, the crews of the ships enjoyed unexpected success in selling for high prices the sea otter pelts they had obtained for trinkets on the North West Coast of America. Most of these valuable furs had been collected in trade with the local Mowachaht-Muchalaht people during Cook's stay during March–April 1778 at Nootka Sound, a large opening of bays, islands, channels, and inlets on the west central coast of Vancouver Island. At first Cook called it King George's Sound, but this was later changed to Nootka, based on Cook's mis-pronunciation Yuquot, the native name of the place. The Mowachaht-Muchalaht had been the principal occupants of the Sound for thousands of years. Due to the prices received by Cook's men at Kamchatka and Macao for furs collected at Nootka Sound, the village of Yuquot in Friendly Cove became the initial focus of the maritime fur trade after 1785.

The description of the possibilities of the North Pacific fur trade in A Voyage to the Pacific Ocean, the official account of James Cook's expedition third expedition to the Pacific, published in May 1784, attracted wide attention. It was based on the journal of James King, who had assumed command of the Resolution after Cook's death in Hawaii. In particular, King's vivid account of the prices paid at Canton for the sea otter furs the crew had gathered on the American coast was repeatedly referred to in public discussion, being published in the London press in September 1785:

During our absence [in Canton], a brisk trade had been carrying on with the Chinese for the sea-otter furs, which had, every day, been rising in their value. One of our seamen sold his stock, alone, for eight hundred dollars; and a few prime skins, which were clean, and had been well preserved, were sold for one hundred and twenty each. The whole amount of the value, in specie and goods, that was got for the furs, in both ships, I am confident, did not fall short of two thousand pounds sterling. And it was generally supposed, that at least two-thirds of the quantity we had originally got from the Americans were spoilt and worn out, or had been given away, and otherwise disposed of, in Kamchatka. When it is remembered that the furs were at first collected without our having any idea of their real value, the first two Otter skins we had having been bought for six green glass beads, the greatest part of them having been worn by the Indians, from whom we purchased them; that they were afterwards preserved with little care, and frequently used for bed-clothes, and other purposes, during our cruise to the North; and that, probably we never received the full value for them in China; the advantages that might be derived from a voyage to that part of the American coast, undertaken with commercial views, appear to me of a degree of importance sufficient to call for the attention of the public.... The rage with which our seamen were possessed to return to Cook's River, and buy another cargo of skins, to make their fortunes, at one time, was not far off mutiny.

King's practical suggestions in A Voyage to the Pacific Ocean of the possibilities of a fur trade between the Northwest Coast and China and Japan revealed the riches to be gained from this trade:

The Russian merchants have a still larger profit upon the furs at Kiachta, on the frontiers of China, which is the great market for them. The best sea otter skins sell generally in Kamchatka, for about thirty rubles apiece. The Chinese market at Kiachta purchases them at more than double that price, and sells them again at Pekin at a great advance, where a further profitable trade is made with some of them to Japan. If, therefore, a skin is worth thirty rubles in Kamchatka, to be transported first to Okotsk, thence to be conveyed to Kiachta, a distance of one thousand three hundred and fifty-four miles, thence to Pekin, seven hundred and sixty-miles more, and after this to be transported to Japan, what a prodigiously advantageous trade might be carried on between this place and Japan, which is but about a fortnight's, at most, three weeks sail from it?

== James Hanna’s voyages ==
The revelation of the riches to be gained from exploiting the furs of the Northwest Coast of America as an item of trade with China and, possibly Japan, caused the partners in trade, John Henry Cox and John Reid, to attempt to take advantage of their situation in Macau and their connections with India. Specifically, Cox and his associates, including Henry Lane, William Fitzhugh and David Lance—English East India Company supercargoes at Macau trading privately on their own account—sponsored a pioneering voyage under James Hanna in 1785. Hanna had been an experienced sailor and a privateer in the American Revolutionary War with a commission on the British side; capturing enemy vessels and being captured himself. He moved to India and then China in search of work after the British defeat in 1783. Setting out from Macau in the brig Sea Otter, on 15 April 1785, Hanna followed the route of the Manila galleons past Japan from where the prevailing winds and current brought him to Nootka Sound on 8 August. Although there was one violent altercation in which a number of native Nuu-chah-nulth lost their lives, Hanna was successful in trading for furs and returned to Macau with 560 pelts worth 20,400 Spanish dollars. Word of this success was sent back to England and reported in the London press on 21 September 1786:

The Sea Otter, Capt. Hannah, arrived from King George's Sound, on the West coast of America, after one of the most prosperous voyages, perhaps, ever made in so short a time. This brig, which was only 60 tons, and manned with 20 men, was fitted out in April 1785, by Capt. Mackintosh, of the Contractor, and some other gentlemen in the Company's service, as an experiment while the Captain is gone to England to procure a licence from the India Company for the carrying on this trade. Should he succeed in his application, of which I presume there is but very little doubt, I am sensible it will insure them a tremendous fortune; you will be astonished when I tell you, that the whole out-fit, with the vessel, did not cost them 1,000l. and though she was not more than one month on the coast, the furs she collected were sold at Canton for upwards of 30,000l. Had they had goods to have bartered, and had been two or three months more on the coast, Captain Hannah assured me he could have collected above 100,000l. of furs.—The beauty of these furs is beyond description, and held by the Chinese in the highest estimation: it is astonishing with what rapidity they purchased them.—Captain Hannah acquainted me that there were several sent home to England as presents; your friend Sir Joseph Banks hath two of them sent by this ship, where no doubt you will see them.—It is astonishing that this business hath not been taken up long before this directly from England, as there is a full description of it in the publication you sent me of Capt. Cook's last voyage: it is fully expected that when the astonishing value of this trade is well known in England, that the Company will send out some of their China ships to trade for furs on that coast, and to try to open a trade from Japan for the disposal of them. Should they be able to accomplish this trade it would be a great acquisition, as it would procure them vast quantities of silver and gold, and the furs would sell for 300 per cent. more than they do at China. The trade is carried on by the Chinese at an amazing advantage.

Encouraged by this financial success, Hanna's backers sponsored a second voyage in 1786. Leaving Macao in May he again reached Nootka Sound in August. He had been preceded by an expedition from Bombay led by James Strange, and as a result he was able to purchase only 50 sea otter skins. Sailing north he discovered and named a number of inlets and islands on the west coast of Vancouver Island, such as Sea Otter Cove, which he named for his ship Sea Otter, and San Josef Bay, which he named St. Patrick's Bay. He made a chart of those parts he visited and bestowed the name of his patrons on several places, such as Cox's Island, Lane's Bay, Fitzhugh Sound, Lance's Islands and MacIntosh's Inlet. Seeing land to the north, which was probably the islands off the continent or even Kunghit Island, the southernmost island of Haida Gwaii, the Irishman James Hanna named it Nova Hibernia, complete with a St. Patrick's Bay. These names, except Fitzhugh Sound, Cox Island and Lance's Island (now spelt, in the Spanish way Lanz Island), were ignored by later cartographers. He then sailed south to Clayoquot Sound on the west coast of Vancouver Island.

Clayoquot Sound was the home of the powerful chief Wickaninnish, who was one of the dominant figures in the maritime fur trade at the end of the 18th century. The population of the large, island-filled bay, probably numbered over 4,000 at the time of Hanna's visit. The village of Opitsaht on Meares Island, opposite the present-day settlement of Tofino, was considered the largest native settlement on the entire Northwest Coast. Hanna continued his explorations and at Ahousat on Vargas Island (today on Flores Island) visited Chief Cleaskinah, who was subsequently later known as "Captain Hanna" as a consequence of an exchange of names in accordance with local custom. But his success in trading for pelts was limited, and shortly after his return to Macau in early 1787 he died before he was able to make a planned third voyage to America. Comekela, younger brother of Chief Maquinna, accompanied Hanna to China in 1786-87. He returned to Nootka Sound with John Meares in 1788.

== See also ==
- History of the west coast of North America
