= Cape Scott Provincial Park =

Provincial park in British Columbia, Canada

- IUCN category II (national park)
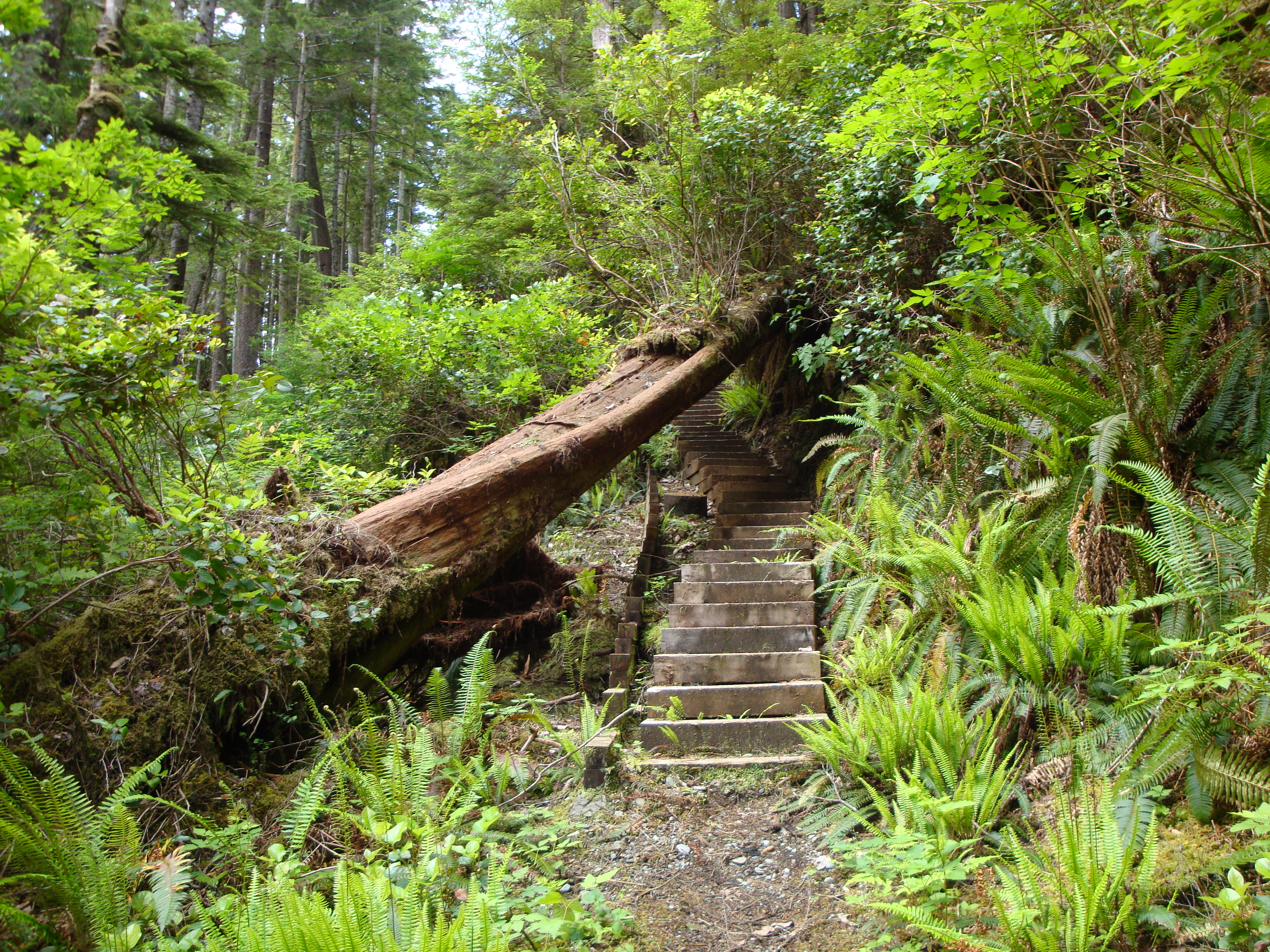
- Forest trail near Laura Creek, Cape Scott Provincial Park

- Location within Vancouver Island Location within British Columbia
- Interactive map of Cape Scott Provincial Park
- Location: northern Vancouver Island, British Columbia
- Coordinates: 50°44′00″N 128°20′00″W
- Area: 222.94 km^{2} (86.08 sq mi)
- Established: 1973
- Governing body: BC Parks
- Website: bcparks.ca/explore/parkpgs/cape_scott/

Cape Scott Provincial Park extends from Shushartie in the east, then westward around Cape Scott and south to San Josef Bay. This coastline comprises the northern tip of Vancouver Island, British Columbia. The 22,294-hectare (55,090-acre) provincial park is about 563 km (350 mi) northwest of Victoria.

== First Nations & explorers ==
In 1786, the cape was named in honour of David Scott, a merchant of Mumbai (Bombay), who had backed James Strange's maritime fur trade voyage to the Pacific Northwest Coast.

The Yutlinuk occupied the Scott Islands until the early 1800s. Remnants mixed with the Nakomgilisala, who traditionally inhabited the Cape Scott area with the Tlatlasikwala. Through amalgamations and relocations, they are known collectively as the Kwakwaka'wakw. Three First Nations reserves are adjacent to the park, including the former village of Nahwitti.

Southeast of the cape is the sand neck between Experiment Bight and Guise Bay. Interpretive signs provide First Nations names and their significance. The bight name meant "whale between on beach", and the neck was "against each other". The terms for the cape were "trail on the surface", "foam place", "sea monster", and "swell on beach". To avoid the turbulent cape waters, the Kwakwaka'wakw would manually haul their canoes across the sandy neck.

== Former communities ==
Promoted to be an idyllic settlement, a Danish-Canadian community was established about 6 km (3.7 mi) east of the cape at the head of Hansen Lagoon in 1897. Supplies were landed about 4 km (2.5 mi) farther east at Fisherman's Bay/Cove, Nissen Bight. The trail linking the lagoon and the bay was upgraded to a wagon road. At the bay, Nels C. Nelson ran the co-op general store, and was the inaugural postmaster 1899–1909. A community hall and newspaper also served the population of about 90. The tidal flats at the lagoon were reclaimed with dykes. Smashed by storms on completion, the dykes were rebuilt.

Unsuitable boats limited worthwhile fishing. Excessive trapping, and cougars moving into the area, eliminated the plentiful game. The big cats also attacked domestic cattle. The community sloop Floyberg, which carried marketable produce to Shushartie and returned with supplies, was shipwrecked in 1899. From 1895, Canadian Pacific Railway Coast Service (CP) (formerly Canadian Navigation) ran a monthly service to Cape Scott, which by 1898, included a Quatsino port of call. Based on typical sea conditions, freight and passengers probably disembarked onto rowboats at the final destination, located somewhere near the cape. This arrangement likely precluded the loading of significant freight for the return journey. In 1909, the cape leg of this service ceased.

The government reneged on its promise to build a road from Quatsino Sound. That decision shattered the opportunity to ship out farming produce, eliminating the ongoing viability of the settlement. By 1909, the harsh environment had dwindled the population, leaving only two residents. New waves of Danish immigrants mainly settled about 17 km (11 mi) south along the San Josef Valley, at San Josef Bay or at Sea Otter Cove, immediately north. This valley is largely outside today's park. From 1910, the nearest significant transportation link was the CP ferry service to Holberg, a destination for cattle drives. During the following decade, a private launch made a weekly Shushartie–Fisherman's Bay freight run, but capacity was limited.

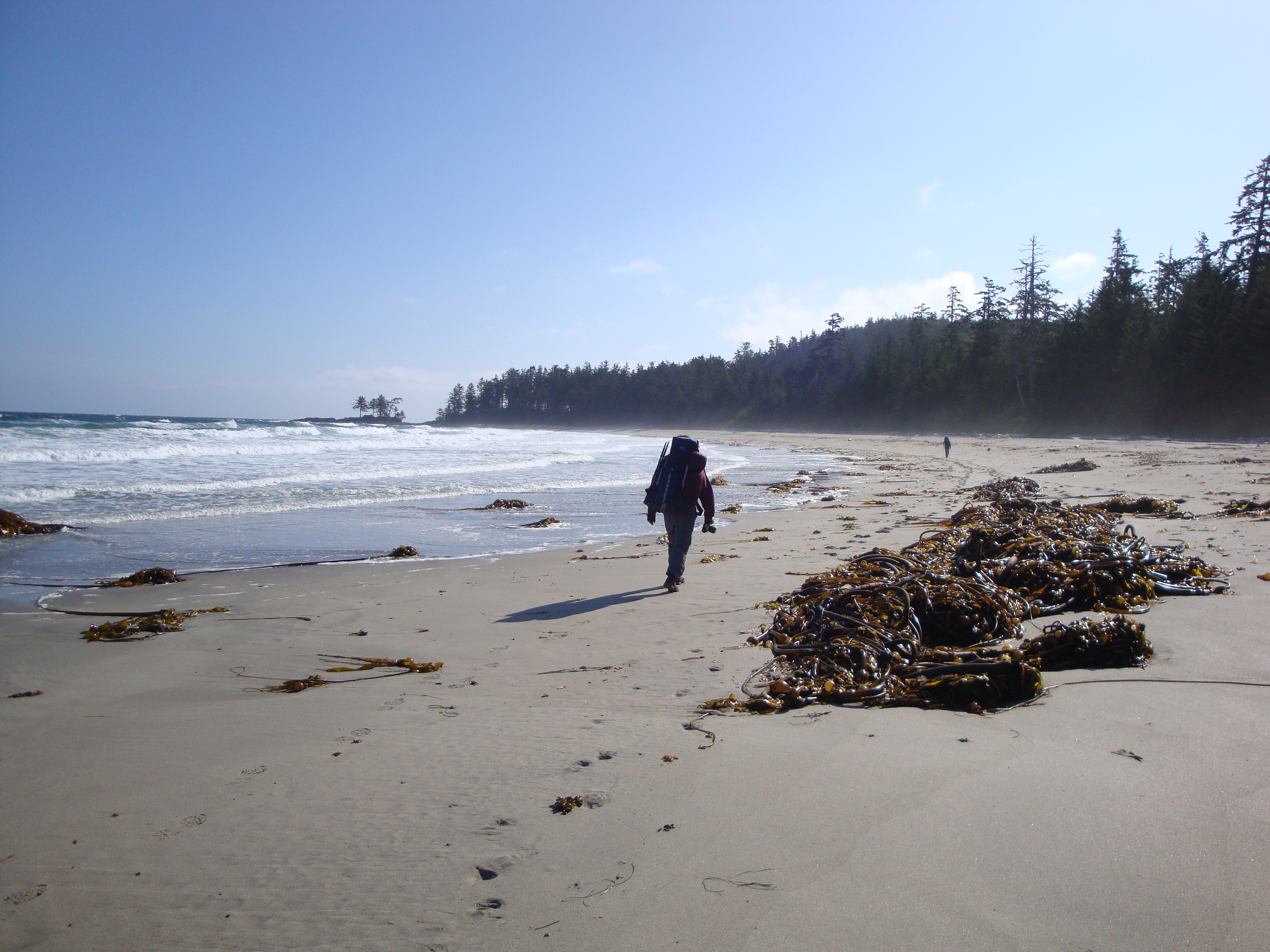
Experiment Bight, Cape Scott, 2009

A number of new arrivals settled at the original location, but from 1914, World War I enlistments decimated all communities. The installation of government telephone lines along the trails connecting Holberg to Cape Scott, San Josef Bay, Sea Otter Cove and Shushartie, was completed in 1915.

Within and adjacent to the park boundaries are privately owned lots. This includes the river mouth property at the former settlement of Strandby about 23 km (14 mi) northeast of the cape. About 8 km (5 mi) farther northeast is a First Nations reserve at the former village of Nahwitti, on Cape Sutil. During the early 1900s, the small launch making the Shushartie–Fisherman's Bay mail run included stops at Nahwitti and Strandby. By 1921, only one elderly bachelor remained at the former, and a married couple at the latter.

At Fisherman's Bay, Theodore Frederiksen was one of the first settlers, and one of the last to leave, when the government acquired his property for the radar station in 1942. His wife had died young, and his two sons had drowned at sea. At the head of the lagoon, Alfred Spencer was the final resident. During the trolling season, he supplied fishermen from a general store within his cabin. Flowers, vegetables, fruit trees, and meadows surrounded the keen gardener's residence. He was the final postmaster 1923–1942, leaving in the mid-1950s. By the 1960s, San Josef Bay was equally abandoned.

Collapsed buildings, rusty farming implements, neglected wells, random fenceposts, and some gravesite monuments, are all that remain of those earlier attempts to settle this unforgiving environment.

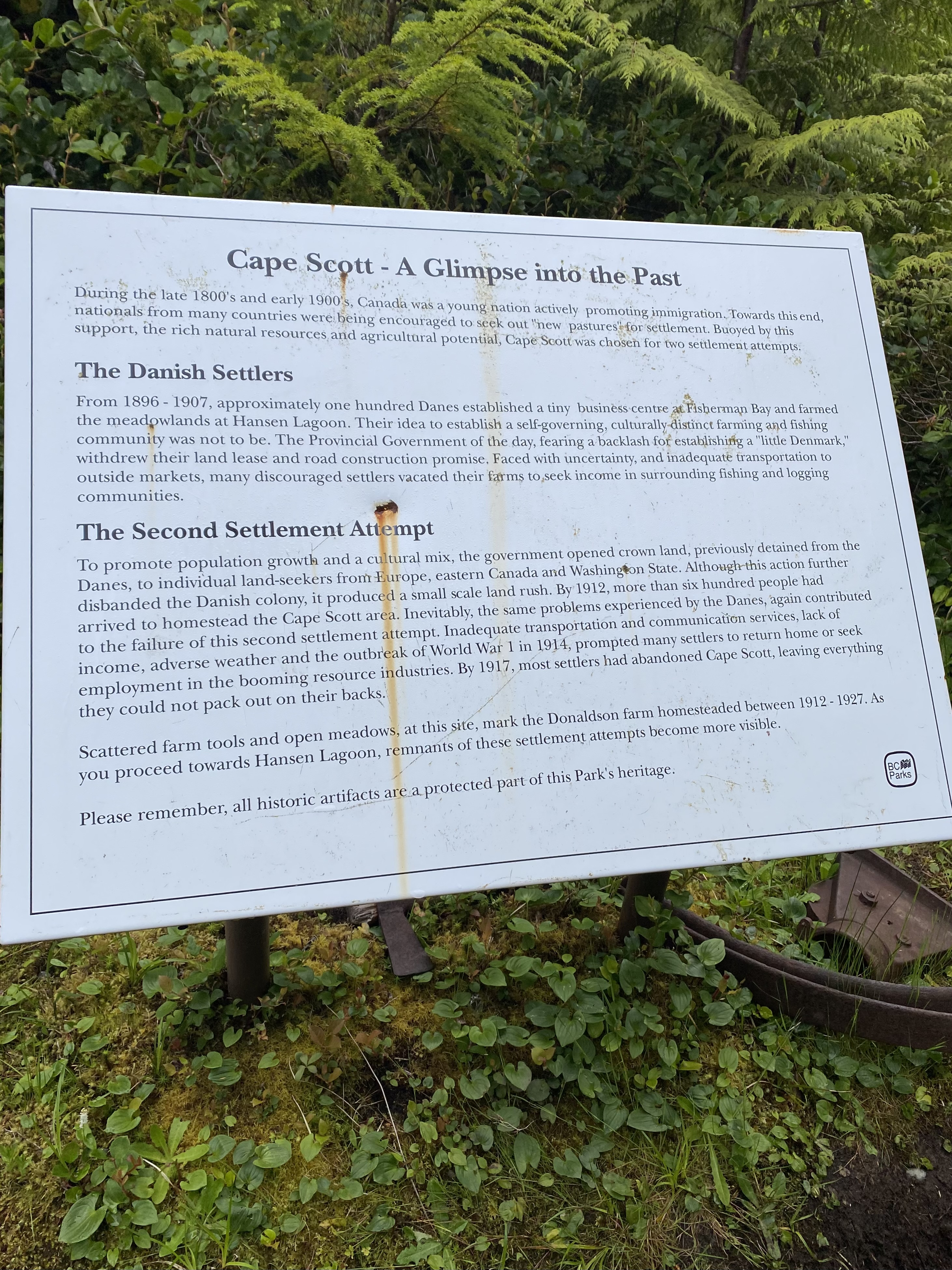
Cape Scott - A Glimpse into the Past

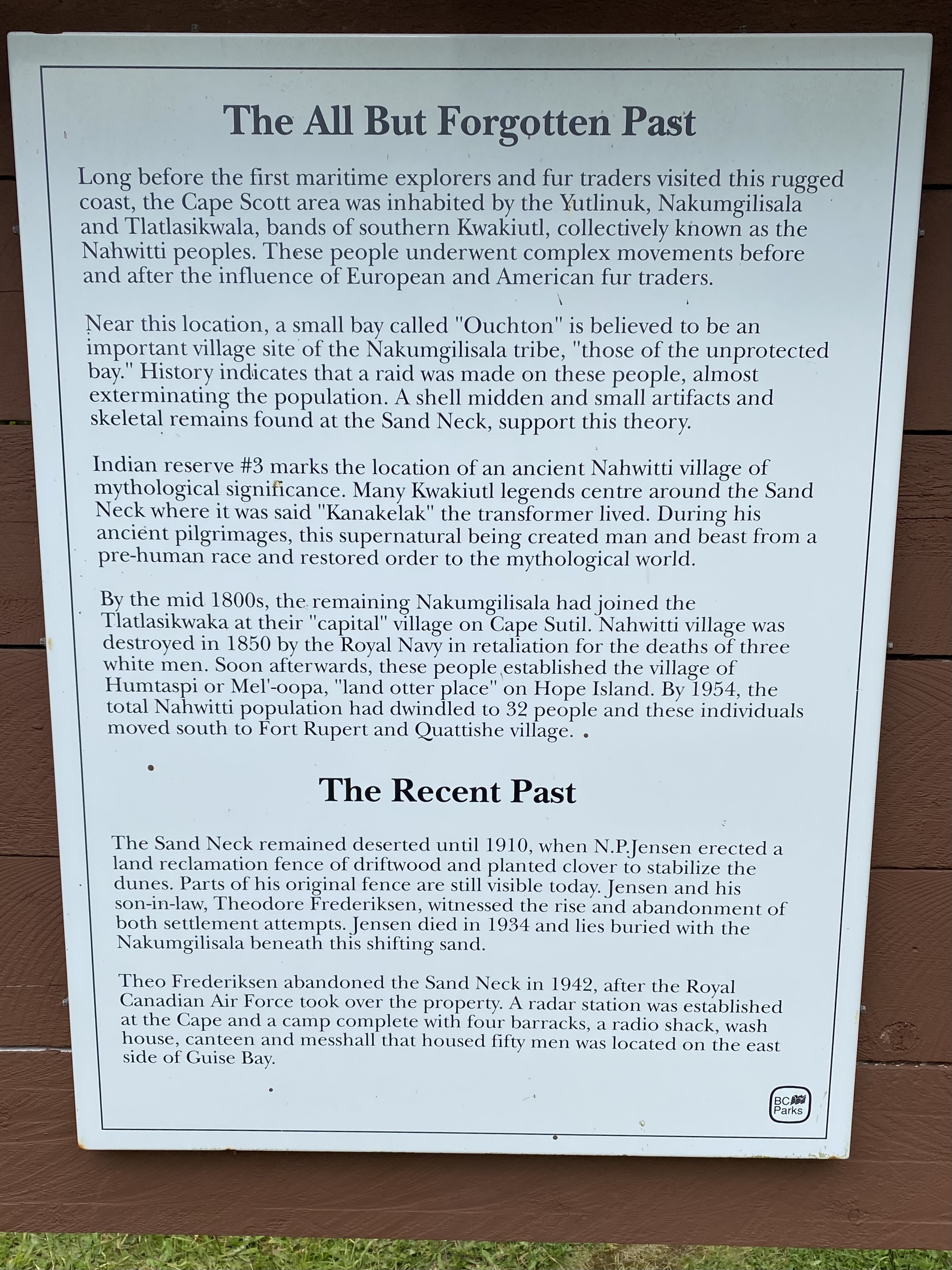
The All But Forgotten Past

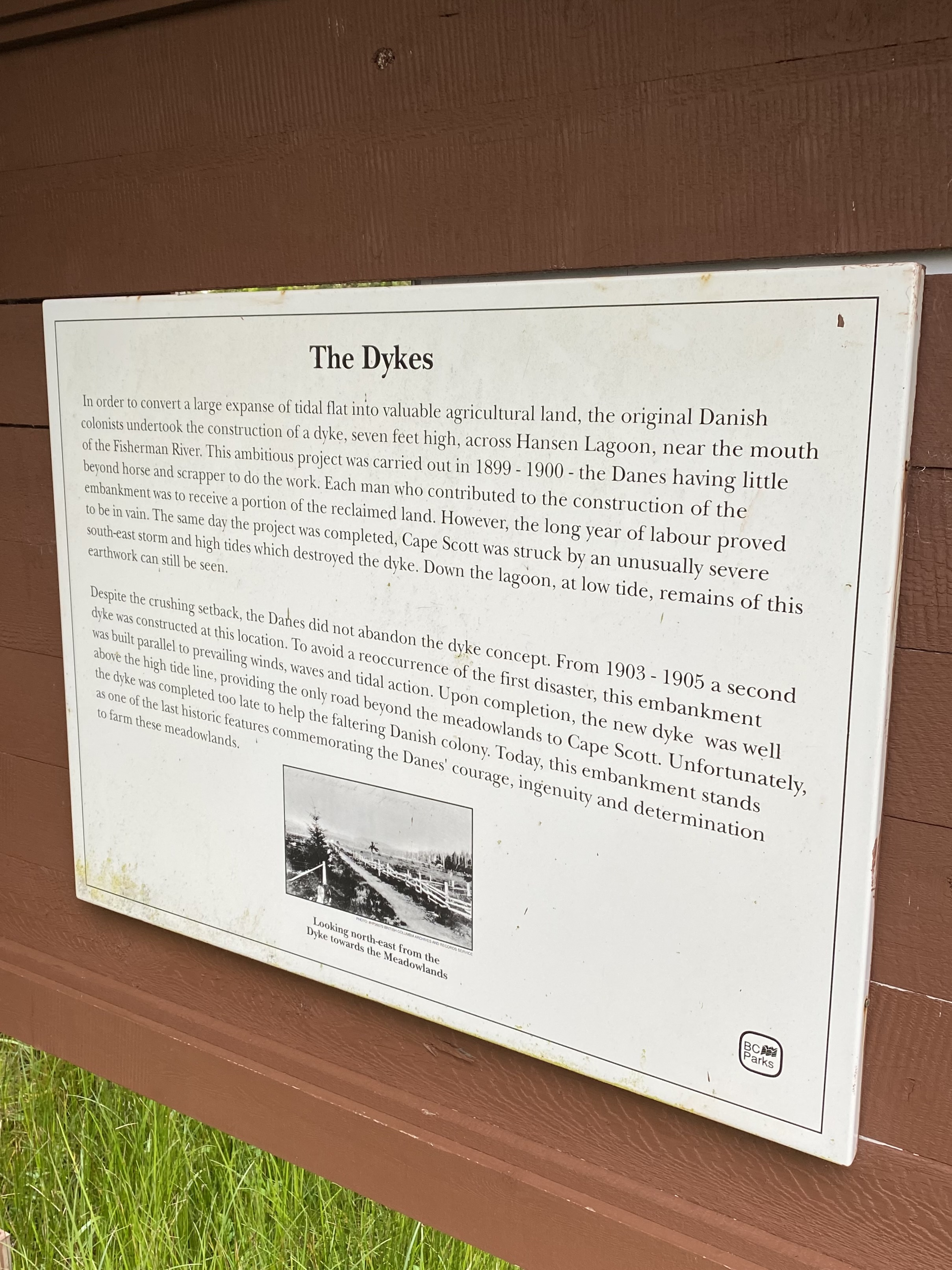
The Dykes

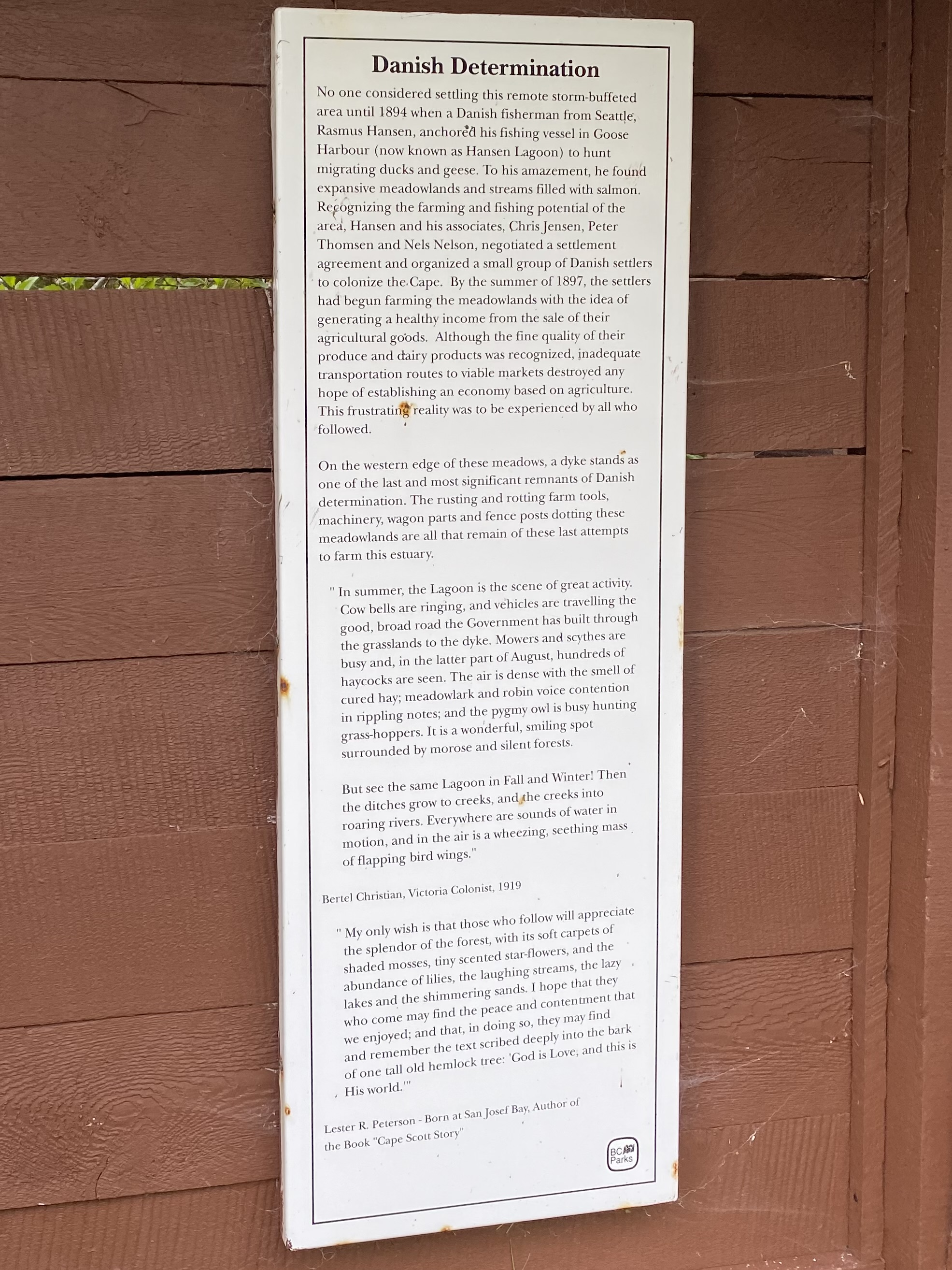
Danish Determination

== Shipwrecks ==
1860: Brig Consort was wrecked at San Josef Bay.

1892: Schooner Maggie Mac broke up and traces were found in a small cove south of Cape Scott.

1896: Sealing schooner Wanderer broke up on rocks near San Josef Bay.

1908: Auxiliary schooner Clara C engine explosion led to wreck off Cape Scott.

1910: Freighter St. Denis, which broke up at sea with the loss of 22 lives, produced debris that washed ashore at Cape Scott.

1942: The tow barge "Fibreboard" was wrecked 15 N.M. off Cape Scott.

1943: Freighter Northholm sank in a gale approximately one-mile northwest off Cape Scott.

1946: Freighter Pelican I was sunk as a breakwater at Fisherman's Bay. Three months later, wind and waves drove it ashore, where it disintegrated over the years.

== Park profile ==
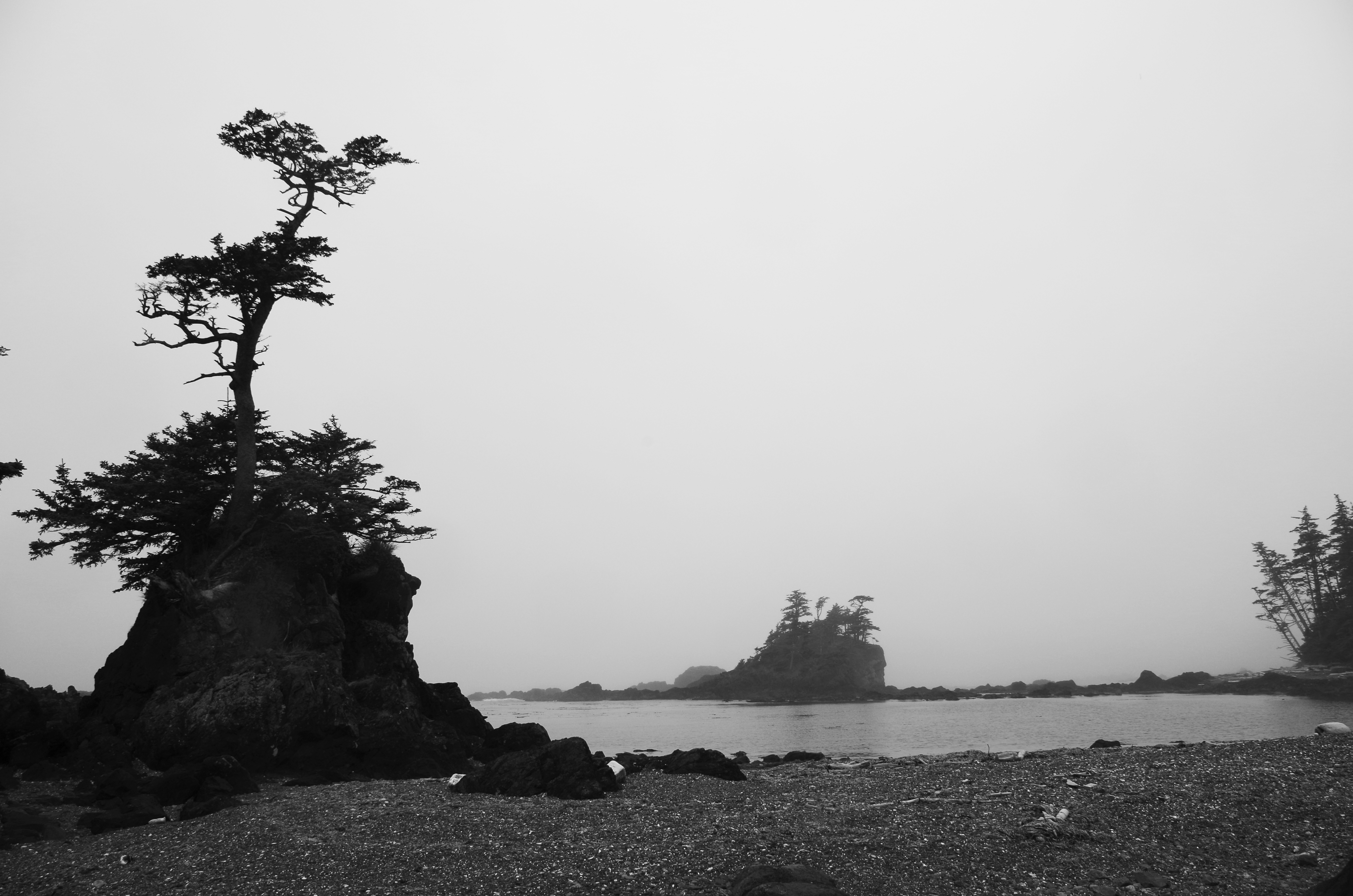
Sea stacks, Cape Scott, 2013

The park was established in 1973 with about 15,100 hectares (37,200 acres), and later expanded to approximately 22,294 hectares (55,090 acres). However, the purchase of private land began earlier. In 1969, a controversial deal was the acquisition of 233 hectares (576 acres), assessed at $300,000, in exchange for $10 million worth of logging rights elsewhere. Most of the park is in the Nahwitti Lowland, which is a subunit of the Hecate Depression, and a part of the Coastal Trough.

The park is known for its old growth forest and sandy beaches. The terrain is rugged, and the area experiences heavy rain and violent storms. The park's highest point is Mt. St. Patrick, 422 metres (1,385 ft) above sea level. The park's largest lake is Eric Lake, at 44 hectares (110 acres).

In 2010, 14 separate private pieces of land, which encompassed about 150 hectares (370 acres), existed within the park. In 2020, the government acquired 76 hectares (190 acres) for the park.

Access to the eastern boundary is by boat or floatplane. During the summertime, a water taxi service operates from Port Hardy. Access to the western end is via the Port Hardy–Holberg–San Josef Bay forest service roads.

== Park facilities ==
The 11 Cape Scott core area trails measure 2.5 to 23.6 km (1.6 to 14.7 mi) each way and are rated as easy/moderate in difficulty. The 43.1 km (26.8 mi) North Coast Trail, an extension of the Cape Scott Trail and a portion of the Vancouver Island Trail, comprises very difficult sections in the east. Water sources are far apart in places. Campsites have pit toilets and often metal food caches and tent platforms. The increasing popularity of the park has generated littering concerns.

A boat launch intended for canoes, kayaks, and small car-top boats exists on the San Josef River, a few kilometers from San Josef Bay.

== Climate ==
The climate type of Cape Scott is (Köppen: Cfb). Cape Scott is located on the west coast of the Pacific Ocean and is affected by the Alaska Current, which moderates year-round temperatures to make them less extreme.

Climate data for Cape Scott Provincial Park Climate ID: 1031353; coordinates 50°46′56″N 128°25′38″W; elevation: 71.6 m (235 ft); 1981−2010 normals, extremes 1965−present
Month	Jan	Feb	Mar	Apr	May	Jun	Jul	Aug	Sep	Oct	Nov	Dec	Year
Record high humidex	17.3	16.7	16.7	20.0	27.5	22.1	24.3	25.4	29.4	22.8	20.0	15.3	29.4
Record high °C (°F)	17.9 (64.2)	17.2 (63.0)	17.2 (63.0)	22.5 (72.5)	27.0 (80.6)	24.5 (76.1)	20.6 (69.1)	23.9 (75.0)	26.7 (80.1)	20.4 (68.7)	21.1 (70.0)	15.0 (59.0)	27.0 (80.6)
Mean daily maximum °C (°F)	7.8 (46.0)	7.7 (45.9)	8.6 (47.5)	10.1 (50.2)	12.0 (53.6)	14.0 (57.2)	15.6 (60.1)	16.2 (61.2)	14.9 (58.8)	12.1 (53.8)	9.4 (48.9)	7.7 (45.9)	11.4 (52.5)
Daily mean °C (°F)	5.7 (42.3)	5.6 (42.1)	6.2 (43.2)	7.6 (45.7)	9.6 (49.3)	11.7 (53.1)	13.4 (56.1)	14.1 (57.4)	12.7 (54.9)	10.0 (50.0)	7.3 (45.1)	5.6 (42.1)	9.1 (48.4)
Mean daily minimum °C (°F)	3.6 (38.5)	3.4 (38.1)	3.8 (38.8)	5.0 (41.0)	7.0 (44.6)	9.3 (48.7)	11.1 (52.0)	11.8 (53.2)	10.5 (50.9)	7.8 (46.0)	5.2 (41.4)	3.5 (38.3)	6.8 (44.2)
Record low °C (°F)	−8.3 (17.1)	−10.7 (12.7)	−4.2 (24.4)	−1.1 (30.0)	2.1 (35.8)	4.4 (39.9)	7.2 (45.0)	7.8 (46.0)	5.0 (41.0)	−3.2 (26.2)	−10.7 (12.7)	−11.1 (12.0)	−11.1 (12.0)
Record low wind chill	−14.2	−20.7	−9.7	−5.1	0.0	0.0	0.0	0.0	0.0	−6.5	−18.0	−20.2	−20.7
Average precipitation mm (inches)	324.7 (12.78)	238.6 (9.39)	240.0 (9.45)	201.6 (7.94)	125.7 (4.95)	117.3 (4.62)	80.2 (3.16)	110.2 (4.34)	147.6 (5.81)	317.7 (12.51)	371.4 (14.62)	329.4 (12.97)	2,604.2 (102.53)
Average rainfall mm (inches)	318.7 (12.55)	229.3 (9.03)	234.4 (9.23)	199.9 (7.87)	125.5 (4.94)	117.3 (4.62)	79.9 (3.15)	110.2 (4.34)	147.6 (5.81)	317.6 (12.50)	369.5 (14.55)	324.1 (12.76)	2,573.9 (101.33)
Average snowfall cm (inches)	6.2 (2.4)	9.0 (3.5)	5.9 (2.3)	1.7 (0.7)	0.2 (0.1)	0.0 (0.0)	0.0 (0.0)	0.0 (0.0)	0.0 (0.0)	0.1 (0.0)	2.0 (0.8)	4.8 (1.9)	29.7 (11.7)
Average precipitation days (≥ 0.2 mm)	24.9	20.7	23.1	20.9	18.4	17.9	16.3	15.6	16.6	23.7	25.0	24.7	247.8
Average rainy days (≥ 0.2 mm)	24.0	20.4	22.7	20.9	18.4	17.9	16.3	15.6	16.6	23.7	25.0	24.3	245.7
Average snowy days (≥ 0.2 cm)	2.4	2.3	2.6	1.5	0.20	0.0	0.0	0.0	0.04	0.33	1.3	2.8	13.5
Average relative humidity (%) (at 1300 LST)	88	85	83	81	82	86	88	89	88	86	87	89	86
Average dew point °C (°F)	2.3 (36.1)	3.6 (38.5)	3.8 (38.8)	5.0 (41.0)	7.5 (45.5)	10.0 (50.0)	12.0 (53.6)	12.8 (55.0)	11.6 (52.9)	8.6 (47.5)	5.6 (42.1)	3.7 (38.7)	7.2 (45.0)
Source: 1981-2010 Environment Canada (dew point, humidity 1951–1980) Canadian Climate Normals 1951–1980

== See also ==
- List of British Columbia Provincial Parks
- List of Canadian provincial parks
- Ronning Gardens
- Cape Scott (Antarctica)
