= Sea Otter Cove =

Cove on Vancouver Island, BC, Canada

Coordinates: 50°40.74′N 128°20.74′W

Sea Otter Cove is a remote place near the north-western end of Vancouver Island which has been part of Cape Scott Provincial Park since 1973. It is north of Mount St. Patrick and San Josef Bay. On land, it is surrounded by forest, and only accessible by boat or a rough hiking trail.

It was named by Captain James Hanna in 1786 after his vessel, the Sea Otter.

At the mouth of the cove is a group of small islands called the Helen Islands. As is common on the west coast of Vancouver Island, there is a high annual rainfall.

Danish immigrants established settlements in the area in the early 20th century, but the environment and isolation proved to be insurmountable. (A proposed road to connect Sea Otter Cove to the nearest communities was never built.) The last residents left in 1925.

According to Don Douglass, among boaters,

Because Sea Otter Cove has a worse reputation than it deserves, it is frequently avoided.

Margaret Sharcott wrote this description of her 1954 visit to Sea Otter Cove:

Just above the beach, the dark evergreen forest was almost black in the rain mists that hung over the whole cove. Above the beach, in the shadow of those sombre trees, were the remains of two old boat-houses, their rotting cedar poles and shakes black with the moisture of this wet land. Farther along, a tumble-down house leaned on its ancient foundations. Although the original clearing around the deserted farmhouse was dotted with young fir trees, I could still recognize the fruit trees that had been planted so long ago. Bits of fences and rotted scraps of board from wind-flattened out buildings protruded from the matted tangle of brown, withered grass, wild blackberry vines and encroaching brush.
