= David Scott (of Dunninald) =

Scottish merchant (1746-1805)

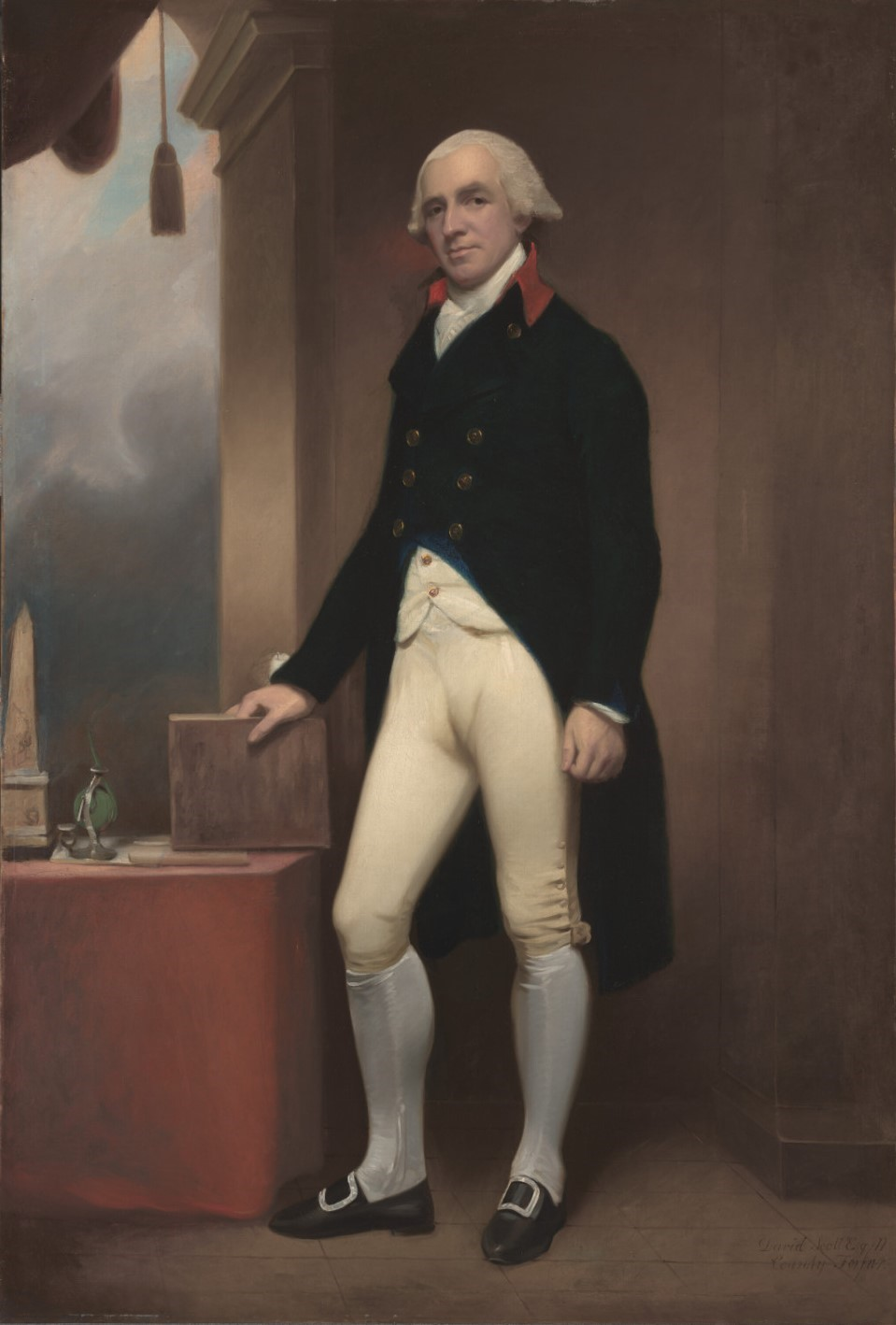
David Scott, Esq., of Dunniald. Painting by George Romney, 1773-1774.

David Scott (27 February 1746 – 4 October 1805) of Dunninald Castle, Angus, was a Scottish merchant and director of the East India Company, and a Member of Parliament (MP). He sat in the House of Commons of Great Britain from 1790 to 1800, and in the House of Commons of the United Kingdom until his death.

== Career ==
Scott was born in early 1746 at the family home, Dunninald House in the parish of Craig, Angus to Robert Scott (1705–1780), the laird of Dunninald, and his wife, Ann. He was educated at the University of St Andrews, before seeking his fortune in India. He built up a substantial merchant business in Bombay before moving to London in 1786 to direct the English end of his business. He became a director of the East India Company in 1788.

In 1785 Scott helped James Charles Stuart Strange in a maritime fur trade. Strange commanded two ships that sailed from India to the Pacific Northwest Coast, collected sea otter furs, then sail to Guangzhou (Canton), China, to sell the furs for a large profit. Captain Cook's last voyage had demonstrated the potential for such a venture. Although the expedition was a commercial failure it explored and made discoveries in the Pacific Northwest, whose geography was only poorly understood at the time. In particular Strange and his captains explored the northern end of Vancouver Island, and discovered and named Queen Charlotte Sound and Queen Charlotte Strait. They named the northwest extremity of Vancouver Island Cape Scott, in honor of David Scott.

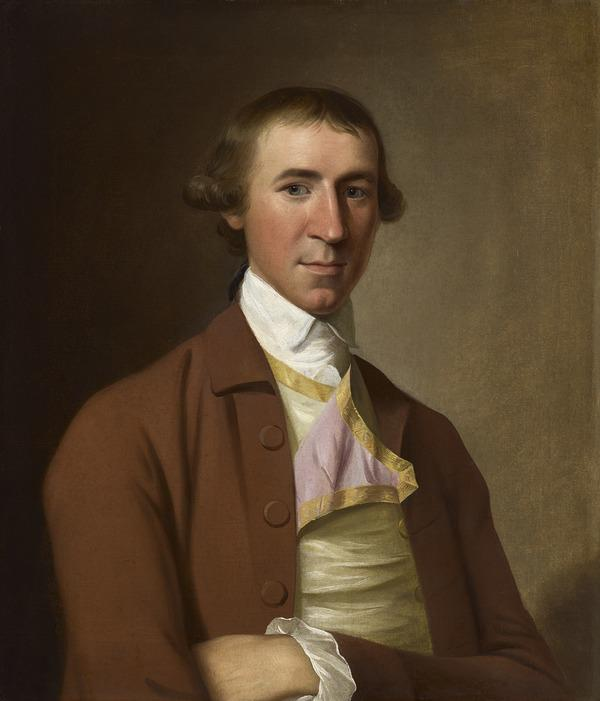
David Scott, Merchant and Director of the East India Company. Painting by Tilly Kettle, c. 1775.

== Parliament ==
At the 1790 general election he was elected unopposed as the MP for Forfarshire, but resigned that seat in early 1796 to contest a by-election in the Perth Burghs, where he was returned unopposed in March 1796. He was re-elected at the general election later in 1796, and held the seat until his death in Cheltenham on 4 October 1805, aged 59, after a long and severe illness.

His son David Scott (1782–1851), who inherited Dunninald, had hoped to succeed his father as MP for Perth Burghs. However, by the time the younger Scott left his father's deathbed, Sir David Wedderburn had already secured so much support that even the backing of Lord Melville was unable to prevent defeat.

Young David went on to become a director of the East India Company in 1814, and in 1819 he inherited a baronetcy from his uncle James Sibbald Scott.

Parliament of Great Britain
| Preceded by Archibald Douglas | Member of Parliament for Forfarshire; 1790–1796 | Succeeded by William Maule |
| Preceded by George Murray | Member of Parliament for Perth Burghs; 1796–1800 | Succeeded by Parliament of the United Kingdom |
Parliament of the United Kingdom
| Preceded by Parliament of Great Britain | Member of Parliament for Perth Burghs; 1801–1805 | Succeeded by Sir David Wedderburn, Bt |
