= Scott Islands =

Group of islands off Vancouver Island, British Columbia

- Location within British Columbia

Geography
- Location: Pacific Ocean
- Coordinates: 50°48′09″N 128°46′46″W
- Major islands: 5

Administration
- Canada
- Province: British Columbia

The Scott Islands are a group of islands located off the northwestern point of Vancouver Island, British Columbia.

== Geography ==
The Scott Islands are located about 10 kilometres (6.4 miles) off of Cape Scott Provincial Park. The chain consists of Lanz Island, Cox Island, Sartine Island, Beresford Island, and Triangle Island, along with several smaller islets and rocks.

== Ecology ==
The Scott Islands are notable for their large seabird populations, including thick-billed murres, tufted puffins, marbled murrelets, and 55% of the world's breeding population of Cassin's auklets. They are also notable for their large populations of Steller sea lions and rockfish. Sea otters have recently re-colonized the islands. The islands are located in hardiness zone 9b, the warmest in Canada.

== Conservation ==
Lanz and Cox islands are both protected by Lanz and Cox Islands Provincial Park, which is open to the public. Sartine, Triangle, and Beresford are all ecological reserves, which are closed to the public. The waters surrounding the islands are protected by Scott Islands Marine National Wildlife Area.
