= North Coast Trail =

Hiking trail on Vancouver Island, British Columbia, Canada

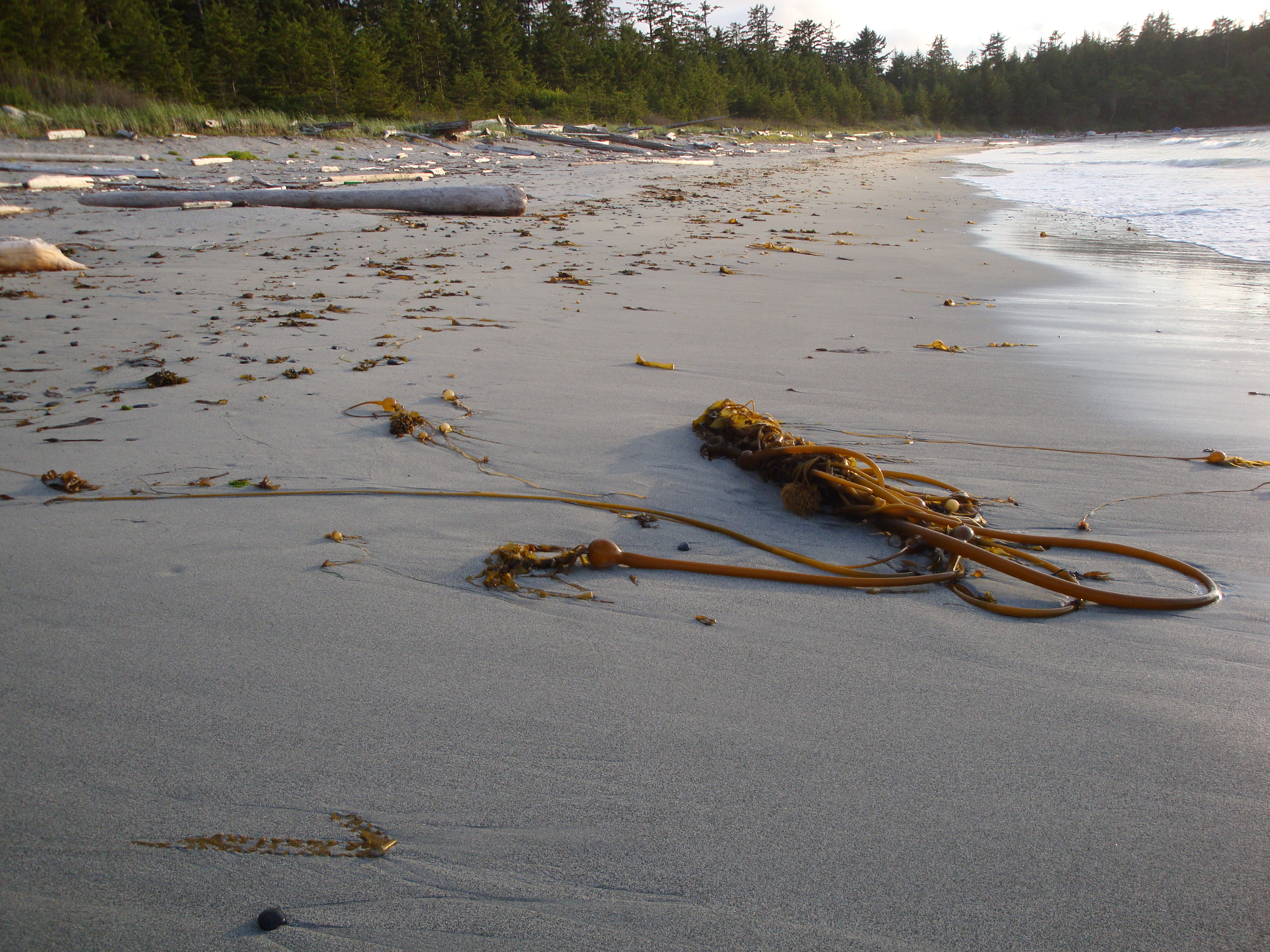
- Beach at Nissen Bight
- Length: 43.1 km (26.8 mi)
- Location: Cape Scott Provincial Park
- Trailheads: Nissen Bight/Shushartie Bay
- Use: Hiking
- Difficulty: Some very difficult sections
- Sights: Beaches, old growth forest, black bears, birds and marine mammals
- Hazards: Steep and rugged sections of trail, slippery rocks and boardwalk

The North Coast Trail is a 43.1 km (26.8 mi) wilderness hiking trail in Cape Scott Provincial Park on northern Vancouver Island, British Columbia, Canada.

== The trail ==
The 43.1 km (26.8 mi) trail in Cape Scott Provincial Park runs along beaches and through forests around the northern tip of Vancouver Island from Shushartie Bay to Nissen Bight. At Nissen Bight, it links up with an existing 15 km (9.3 mi) trail which leads to the trailhead at San Josef River. The trail crosses the Nahwitti River via ladders, stairs, and a cable car. The total distance for hikers between the trailheads is 59.5 km (37.0 mi). The trail is in a wilderness area and hikers may see black-tailed deer, Roosevelt elk, black bear, cougars, Vancouver Coastal Sea wolves, seabirds, seals, sea lions, grey whales and sea otters. In two failed attempts, Danish pioneers tried to settle the area at the turn of the twentieth century and the trail incorporates some of their original routes.

Detailed route information is available on the BC Parks - Cape Scott hiking page.

== Access ==
The parking lot for Cape Scott Provincial Park, located at San Josef River, can be accessed by car by driving 64 km (40 mi) over logging roads from Port Hardy. There is currently no road access to the other terminus at Shushartie Bay and hikers will have to use either a water taxi or seaplane to access the trail. The long-term management plan for the park includes a proposal for construction of a road to the bay and a vehicle-accessible campground.

== Creation ==
In 1994, the Vancouver Island Land Use Plan recommended that the Nahwitti-Shushartie area be added to Cape Scott Provincial Park. The creation of the North Coast Trail is largely due to the fundraising and lobbying efforts of the Northern Vancouver Island Trails Society. The trail is seen as a way to diversify the economy of northern Vancouver Island by providing a major tourist attraction that will bring visitors to the area. Finalization of the route and construction of the trail began in September 2004. The trail was expected to open in the fall of 2006. The trail was officially completed on May 8, 2008 and the grand opening was held on May 10, 2008. The trail is now open to the public. The trail was surveyed and constructed by Strategic Forest Management Incorporated, who will continue to maintain and manage the trail.

The North Coast Trail is also designated as the northernmost leg of the Vancouver Island Trail.

== Gallery ==
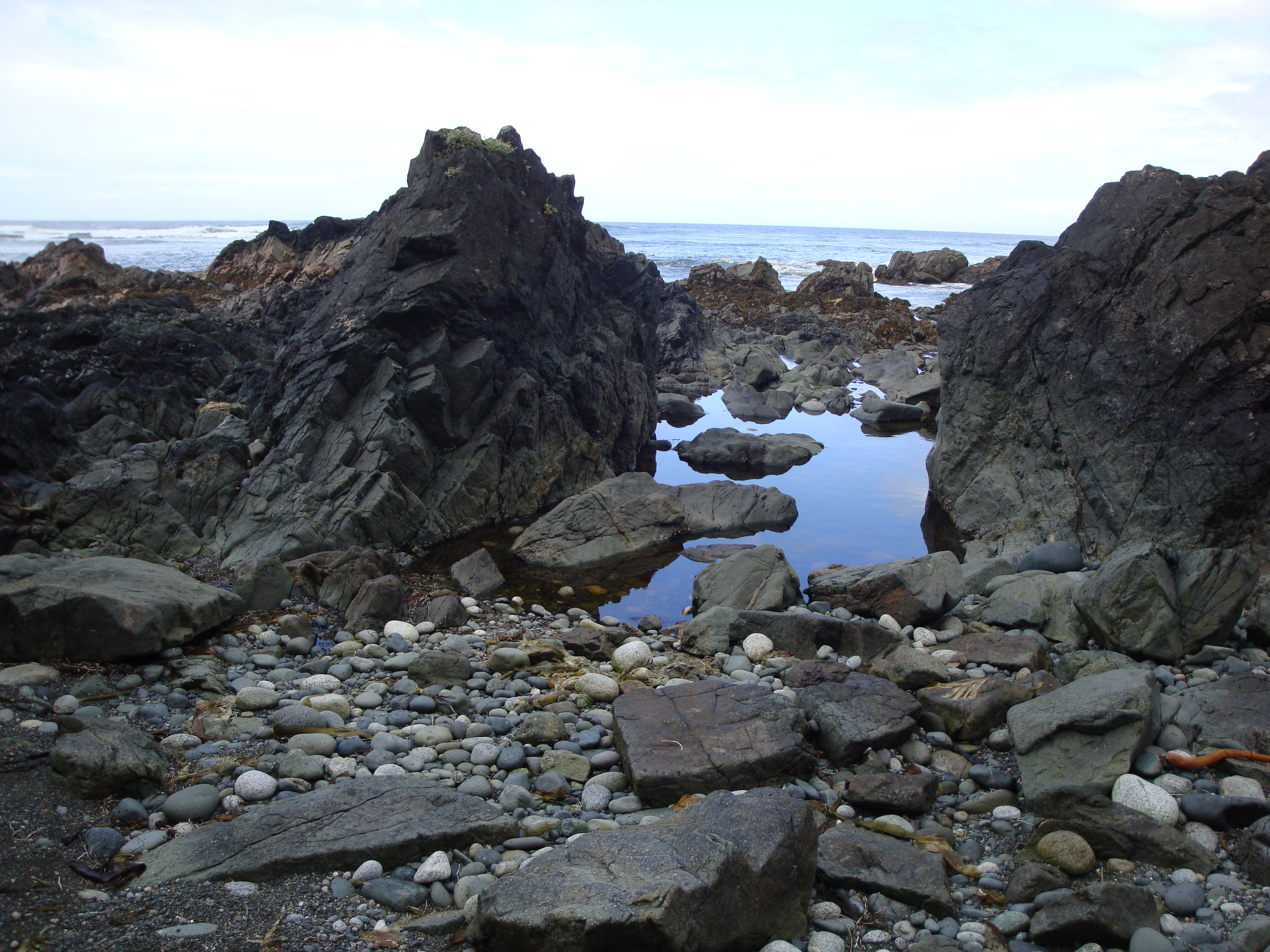
Seashore and tidepools

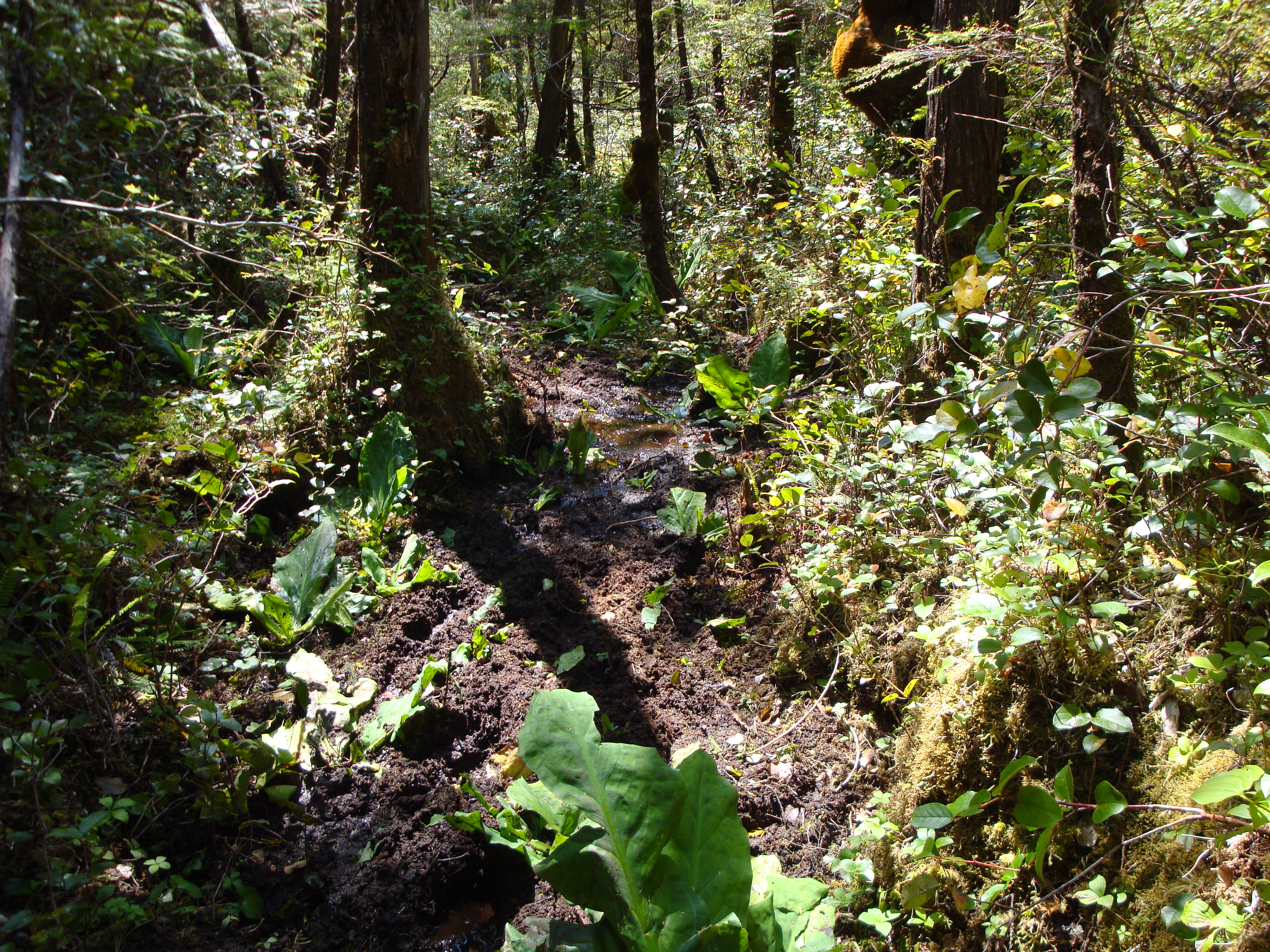
Narrow and muddy sections are common

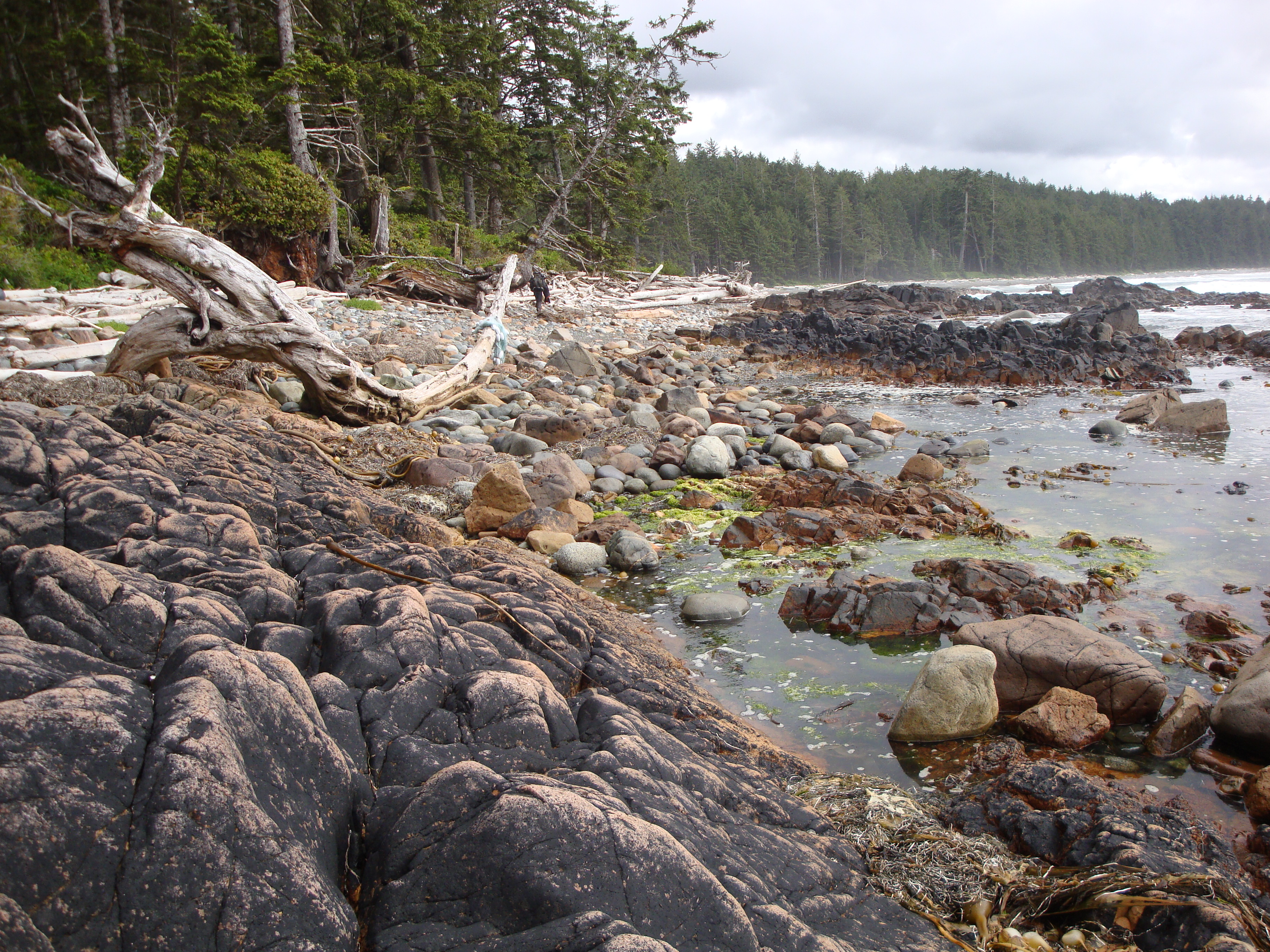
High tide at the Christensen Coast section between Laura Creek and Shuttleworth Bight

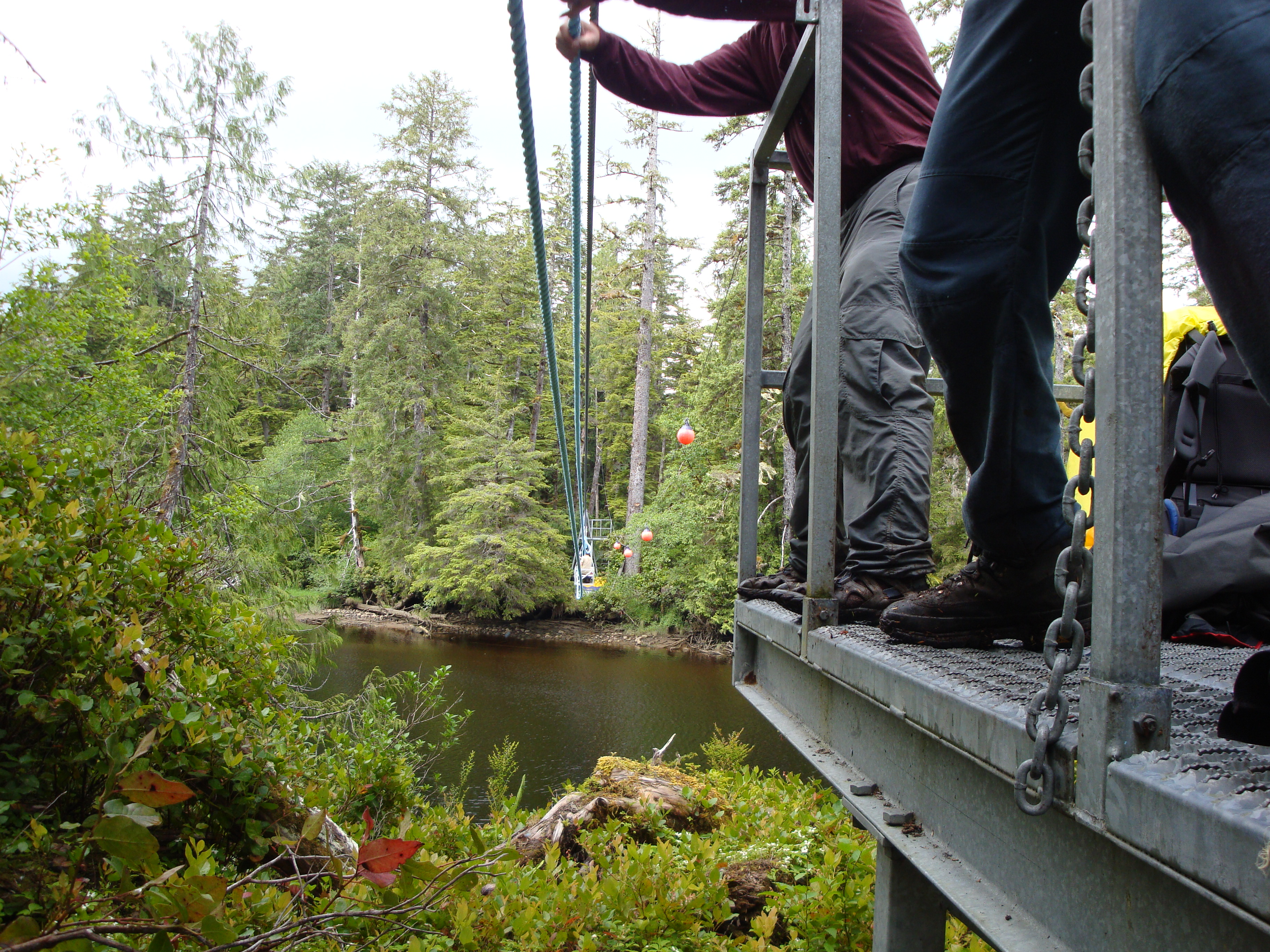
Crossing of the Strandby River is by cable car

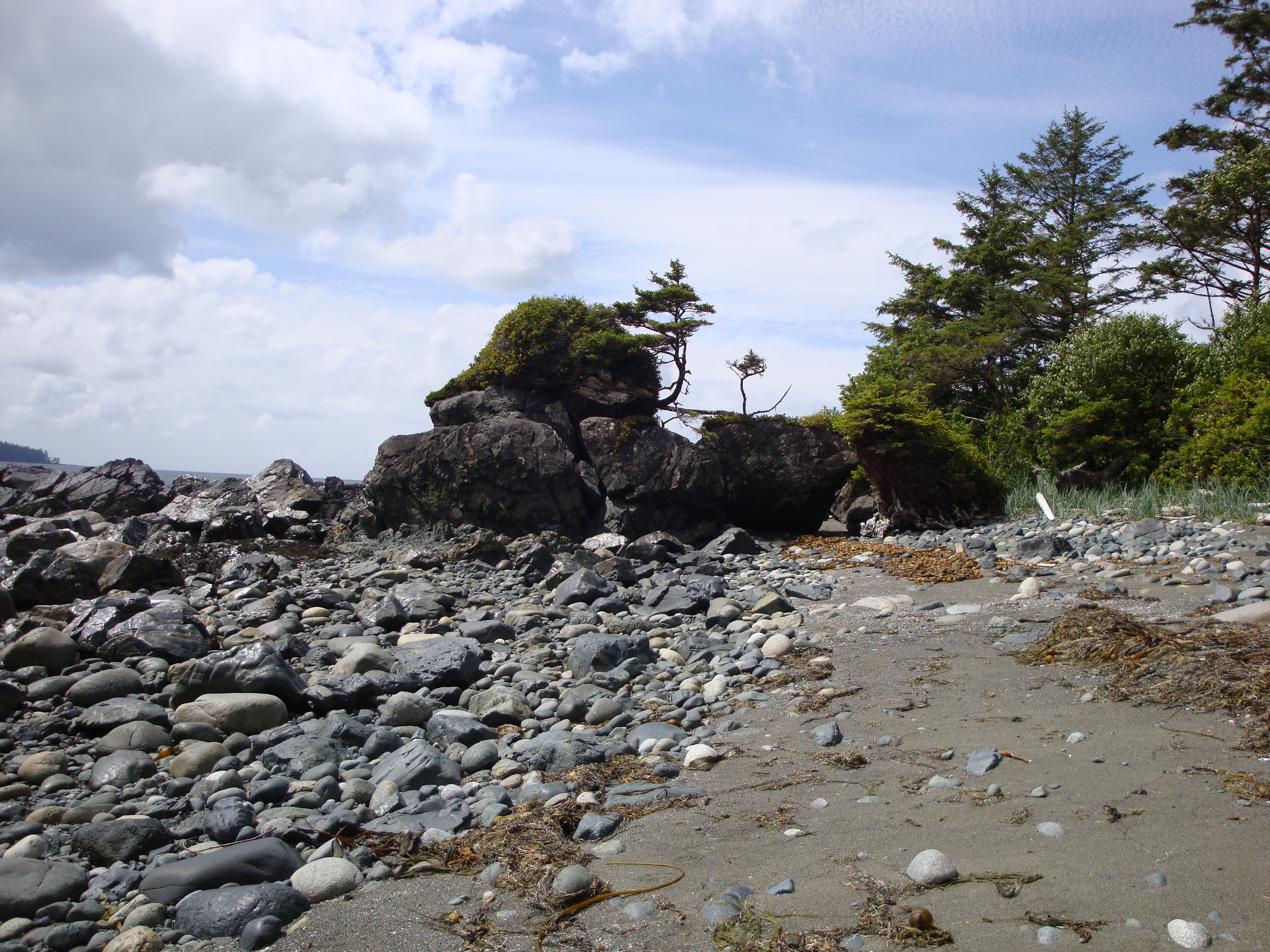
Beach section between Shuttleworth Bight and Cape Sutil
