= 1893 in architecture =

The year 1893 in architecture, involved some significant architectural events and new buildings.

== Events ==
- May 1 – The World's Columbian Exposition, including 600 temporary buildings, opens to the public in Chicago, USA.

== Buildings and structures ==
=== Buildings completed ===
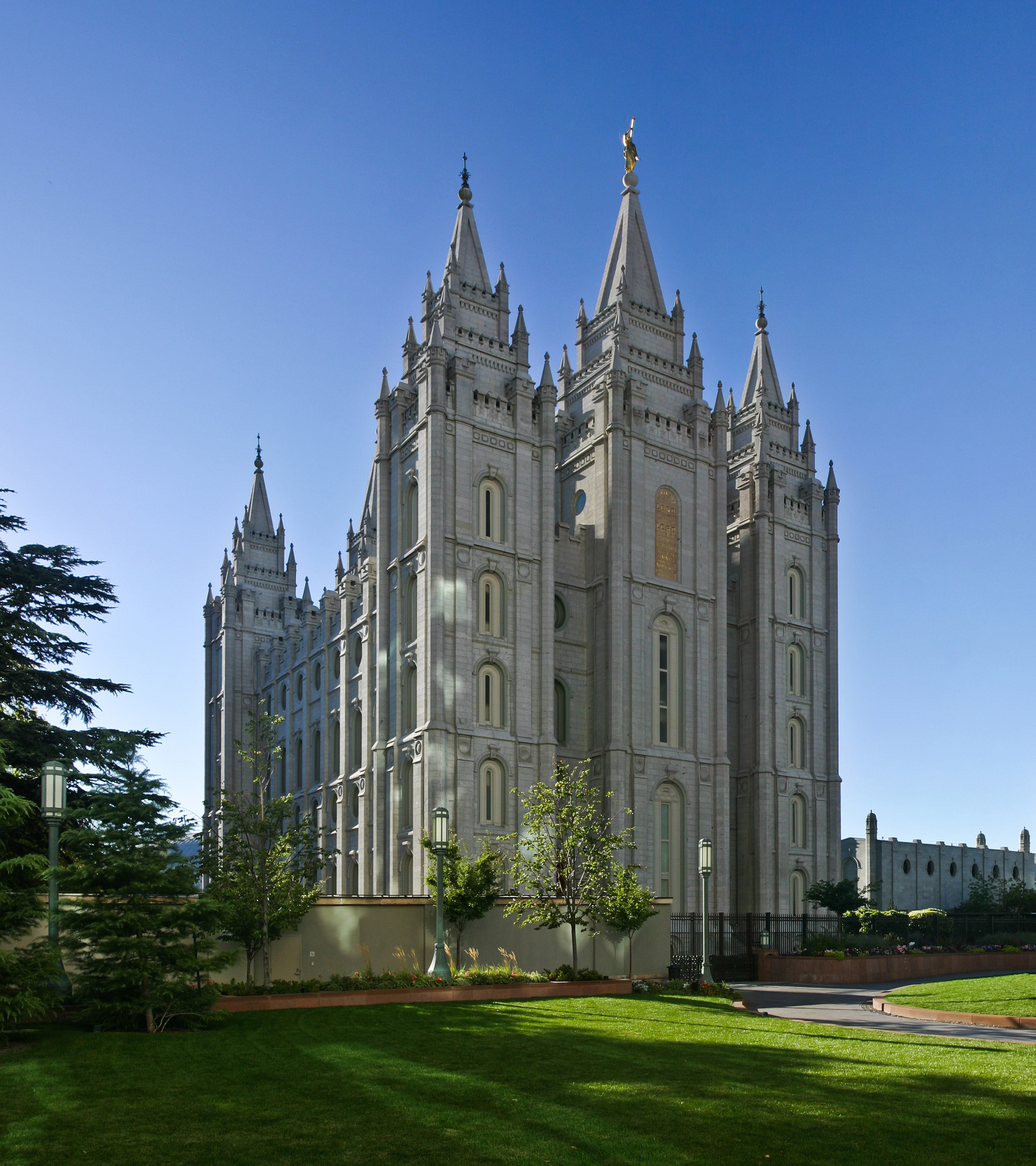
Salt Lake Temple

- Juliusz Słowacki Theatre, Kraków, Poland, designed by Jan Zawiejski, opened as the Teatr Miejski on October 21.
- Museum for the Macedonian Struggle (Thessaloniki)
- Refinery for Pacific Coast Borax Company, the first reinforced concrete building in the United States.
- Salt Lake Temple in Salt Lake City, Utah, United States.
- St. Mary's Cathedral in Glasgow, Scotland, UK.
- St. Michael the Archangel Church in Kaunas, Lithuania.
- Saint-Pierre-le-Jeune Catholic Church in Strasbourg, France, completed.
- Château Frontenac hotel for Canadian Pacific Railway in Old Quebec, designed by Bruce Price, opened on December 18.
- Broad Street Station, Philadelphia, Pennsylvania, USA, designed by Frank Furness and the largest passenger railroad terminal in the world at this time.
- Reconstruction of Ramsay Garden, Edinburgh, Scotland, by Patrick Geddes, Stewart Henbest Capper and Sydney Mitchell.
- Bradbury Building in Los Angeles, California, United States.

== Awards ==
- RIBA Royal Gold Medal – Richard Morris Hunt.
- Grand Prix de Rome, architecture: François-Benjamin Chaussemiche.

== Births ==
- February 14 – Kay Fisker, Danish architect, designer and educator (died 1965)
- February 28 – Ivan Vasilyov, Bulgarian architect (died 1979)
- May 19 – Gudolf Blakstad, Norwegian architect (died 1985)
- June 1 – Otto Eisler, Czech architect (died 1968)
- September 15 – Rene Paul Chambellan, American architectural sculptor (died 1955)
- September 20 – Hans Scharoun, German architect (died 1972)
- September 27 – Ad van der Steur, Dutch architect (died 1953)

== Deaths ==
- February 6 – Jacob Weidenmann, American landscape architect (born 1829)
- February 24 – Francis Fowler, English architect (born c. 1819)
- April 18 – Richard Carpenter, English Gothic Revival architect (born 1841)
