= Ramsay Traquair (architect) =

Scottish architect and academic

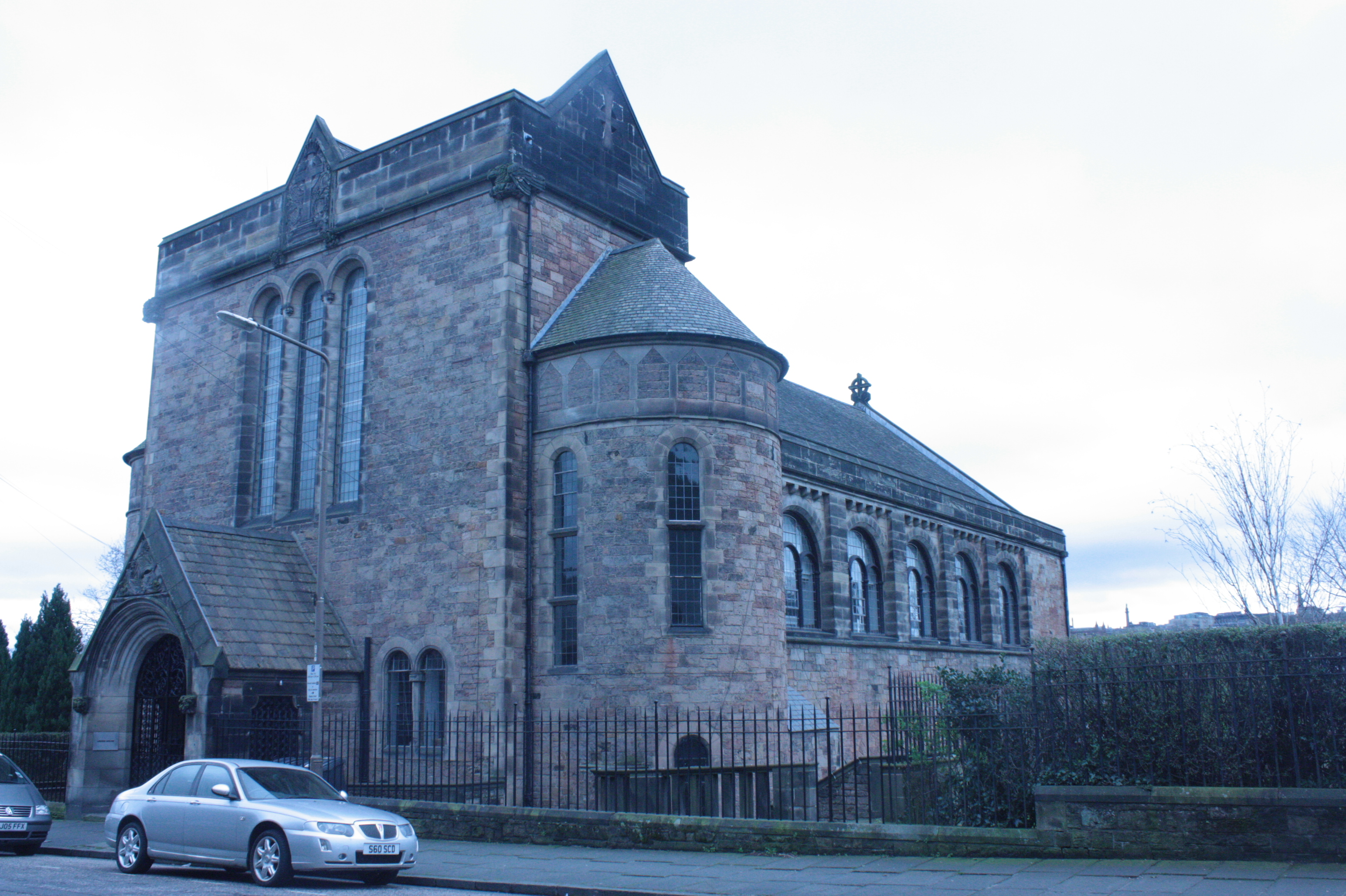
Church of Christ Scientist, Inverleith Terrace, Edinburgh

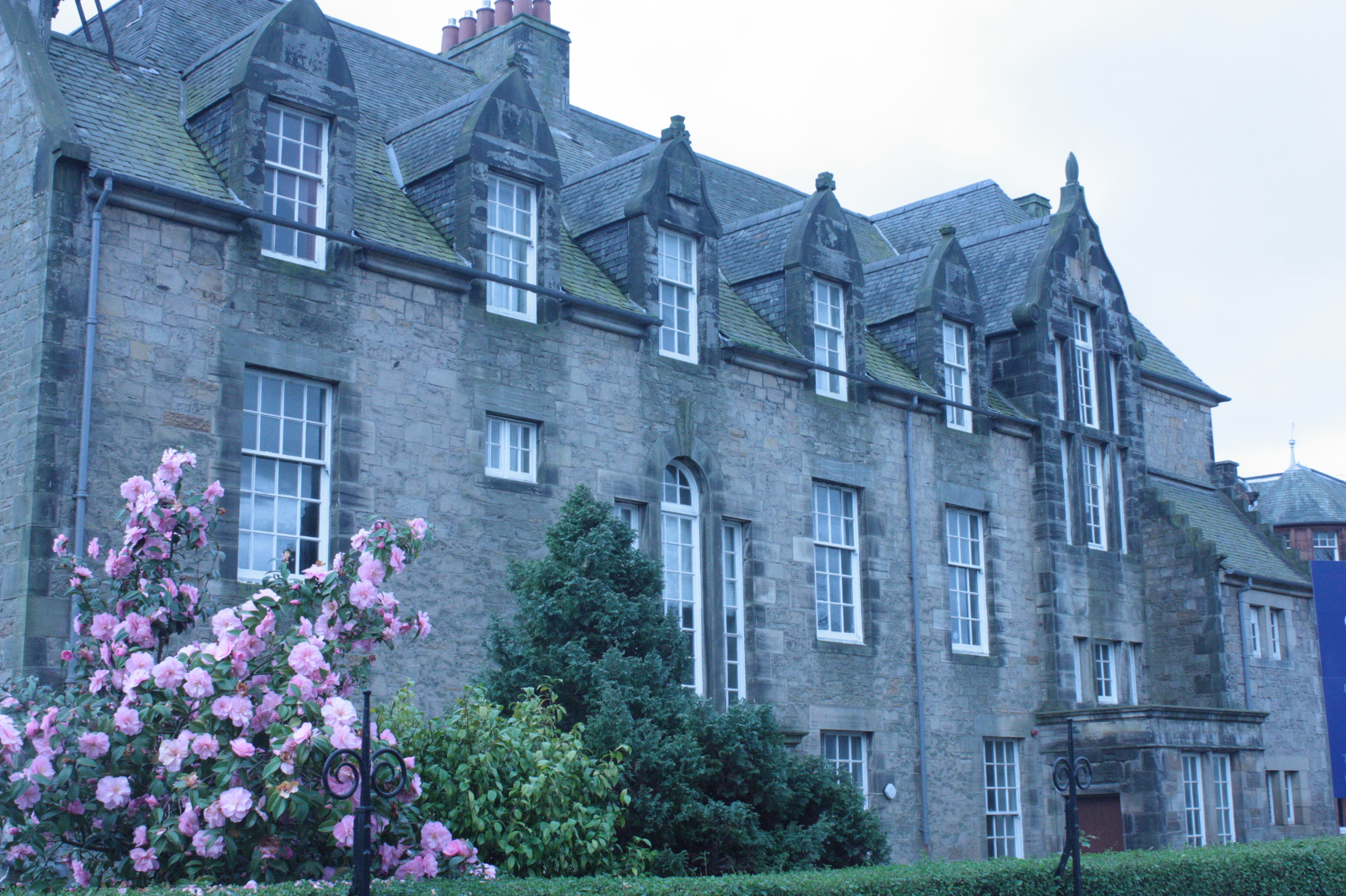
MacKenzie House, Kinnear Road, Edinburgh

Ramsay Traquair (29 March 1874 – 26 August 1952) was a Scottish architect and academic with strong links to Canada. He is remembered more for his numerous publications than for his buildings, which are limited in number. He was a particular expert on Early Canadian and French-Canadian architecture.

== Life ==
He was born of distinguished parents. His mother was Phoebe Anna Moss, an important artist, best remembered under her married name of Phoebe Anna Traquair. His father was Dr Ramsay Heatley Traquair.

Traquair was born in Edinburgh and educated at Edinburgh Academy 1884–1891 with his younger brother Harry Moss Traquair. He attended both the University of Edinburgh and Bonn University 1891–1892 but did not stay to take a degree.

== Architecture ==
He trained under Stewart Henbest Capper and also studied in the newly formed Edinburgh College of Art in 1892 under both Capper and his partner Frank Worthington Simon. He then joined the office of John More Dick Peddie and George Washington Browne, also giving occasional assistance to Robert Lorimer, all providing him an excellent architectural pedigree. He worked here from 1892 to 1899. He then briefly worked in London for Samuel Bridgman Russell before qualifying as a full architect in early 1900.

== Academic life ==
Immediately following qualification as an architect he began pursuing an academic career rather than practice architecture.

He was employed by the Turkish government to study and record the lesser Byzantine churches of the Constantinople area, working with Professor Alexander van Millingen.

He returned to Edinburgh in 1904 taking up the post of a lecturer in architecture and architectural history at the College of Art.

Although he set up a private practice in 1905 his work was both limited and highly interrupted by numerous returns to the east where he was also highly involved in work for the British School of Archaeology in Athens.

In 1909 Gerard Baldwin Brown proposed Traquair as successor to Percy Erskine Nobbs at McGill University in Montreal, Canada. This decision was delayed and he eventually took up this role in 1913. His final years in Edinburgh were spent at 4 Forres Street, a huge Georgian House on the Moray Estate.

He worked at McGill until retirement in 1939 concentrating on studies in early Canadian and French-Canadian architecture. He was a regular contributor of papers for journals, in particular that of the Royal Architectural Institute of Canada.

== Designs ==
- Reconstruction of Skirling House (1908)
- MacKenzie Boarding House for Edinburgh Academy, Kinnear Road, Edinburgh (1910)
- Church of the First Christ Scientist, Inverleith Terrace, Edinburgh (1910–11)

In 1912 he worked on an unexecuted scheme to complete the National Monument on Calton Hill with Sir Frank Mears.

== Death ==
Traquair died in Guysborough in Nova Scotia on 26 August 1952.
