= Maggie Hamilton =

Scottish artist (1867–1952)

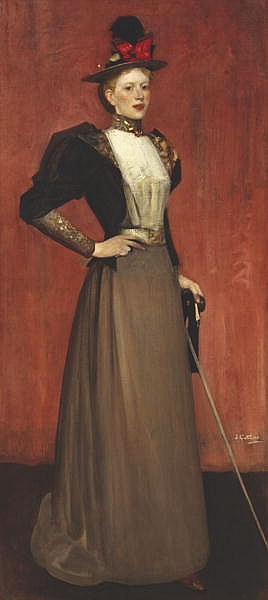
- Maggie Hamilton by James Guthrie
- Born: Margaret Hamilton; 1 September 1867; Glasgow, Scotland
- Died: 31 January 1952 (aged 84); Helensburgh, Scotland
- Known for: Embroidery, painting
- Spouse: Alexander Nisbet Paterson

Margaret Hamilton (1 September 1867 – 31 January 1952) was a Scottish artist known for her paintings and embroidery work.

== Biography ==
Hamilton was born in Glasgow and grew up in Helensburgh after her family moved there. Although she had no formal artistic training, Hamilton became associated with the Glasgow Boys through her elder brother, James Whitelaw Hamilton. In 1883, while staying with her brother at Cockburnspath, where the Glasgow Boys were spending their summers, Hamilton was asked to help James Guthrie's mother with domestic work. Guthrie subsequently painted several portraits of Hamilton, most notably his 1892 diploma group portrait, Midsummer.

In 1897 Hamilton married the architect Alexander Nisbet Paterson, the younger brother of the artist James Paterson. The family home, The Long Croft was designed by Paterson and decorated by Hamilton in the Arts and Crafts style with figure and floral designs and embroideries. For some time Hamilton had been creating oil paintings of flowers but also began painting still-life compositions. In the late 1890s her Chinese silk embroideries were widely praised.

Throughout her career, Hamilton had over ninety works shown at the Royal Glasgow Institute of the Fine Arts and over forty at the Royal Scottish Academy. She was a member of the Glasgow Society of Lady Artists and twice served three-year terms as its Vice President.

Hamilton and Paterson had two children together, including the artist Viola Paterson. In 1977 the Belgrave Gallery in London held a group exhibition of works by members of the Paterson family that included a large embroidery by Hamilton, one that she had worked on for five years. Kelvingrove Art Gallery and Museum holds examples of her work.
