= Viola Paterson =

British wood engraver and woodcut artist (1899-1981)

- Born: Mary Viola Paterson; 19 February 1899; Helensburgh, Scotland
- Died: 1981 (aged 81–82); Scotland
- Education: Slade School of Art; Glasgow School of Art; Académie de la Grande Chaumière
- Known for: Painting and printmaking

Mary Viola Paterson (19 February 1899 – 1981) was a Scottish painter, wood engraver and colour woodcut artist.

== Biography ==
Paterson was born in Helensburgh in Scotland into an artistic family, her father being the architect Alexander Nisbet Paterson whilst her mother, Maggie Hamilton, was a painter and embroiderer. The artist James Paterson, one of the Glasgow Boys, was an uncle of Viola Paterson as was William Paterson who ran a Bond Street art gallery. She was the subject of a painting by William Russell Flint entitled The Fawn Habit.

While attending a finishing school in London during 1917 and 1918 Paterson took lessons, on a part-time basis, from Henry Tonks at the Slade School of Art before returning to Scotland and studying at the Glasgow School of Art from 1919 to 1923. She continued her studies in Paris at the Académie de la Grande Chaumière until 1925 and also attended the school run by André Lhote in Montparnasse. Paterson remained based in Paris but also travelled widely throughout Europe, including making extended visits to both Malta and Venice. Paterson designed three stained glass windows for St. Bride's Church in Helensburgh which were completed and installed in 1931. After a period of time in the south of France, Paterson returned to Britain, sailing on one of the last commercial departures from the Mediterranean before the start of World War II. During the war she served with the Admiralty in Oxford and then lived in the Chelsea area of London when the conflict ended. In 1955 she returned to Helensburgh, where she lived at Long Croft, the family home designed by her father, for the remainder of her life.

Paterson was a prolific painter and printmaker. She often produced colour woodcut prints in limited editions of six or twelve, often combining printed areas with painted watercolour additions. She developed a technique, which she called Wood Types, for engraving lines onto a wood block to separate different painted areas of colour. Notable prints by Paterson included Ballet Dancers shown at the Society of Graver Painters in Colour in 1932, Lobster shown at the Redfern Gallery in 1937 and a series of colour lithographs, Fishing in the River Bank, which she produced in 1940.

Paterson exhibited at the Royal Academy in London, with the Royal Scottish Academy, the Royal Glasgow Institute of the Fine Arts, the Society of Scottish Artists and the Society of Artist Printmakers. Among commercial galleries both the Belgrave and Parkin Galleries hosted shows of her work. Her work was also included in the Belgrave Gallery's 1977 exhibition on the Paterson family and a solo retrospective was held at The Round House at Havering-atte-Bower during 1983. The British Museum holds three examples of her prints and the Victoria and Albert Museum has an example of her Lobster print.
