= A. N. Paterson =

Scottish architect

Alexander Nisbet Paterson
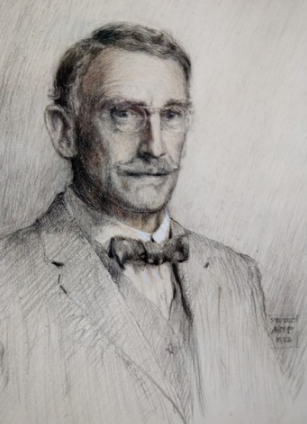
- Born: 3 May 1862; Glasgow, Scotland
- Died: 10 July 1947 (aged 85); Helensburgh, Scotland

Alexander Nisbet Paterson ARIBA PRIAS (1862–1947) was a Scottish architect, mainly working in the Arts and Crafts style. He was president of the Royal Institute of Architects in Scotland (RIAS).

== Life ==
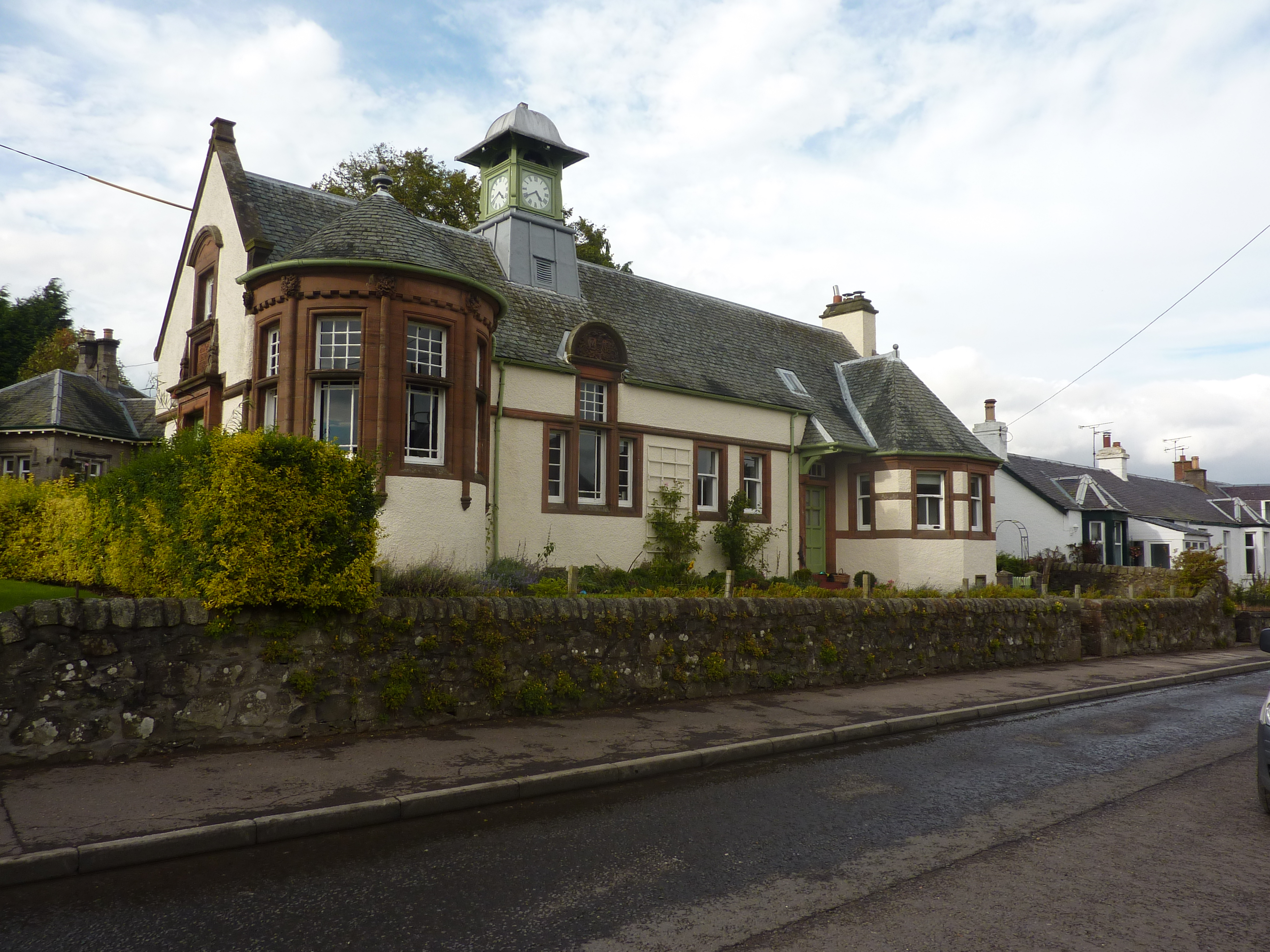
Arngask Library

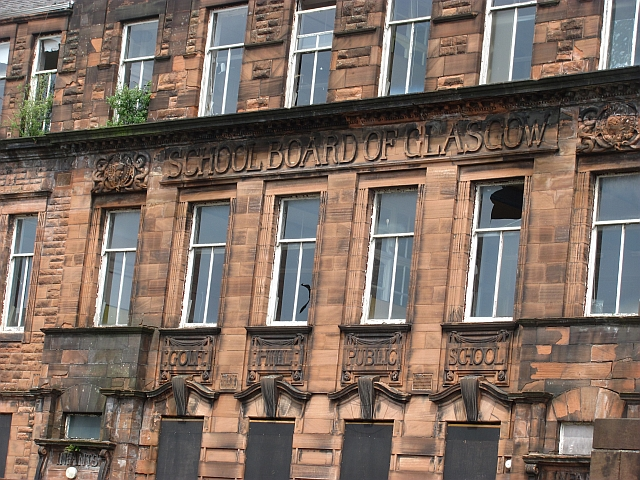
Golfhill School (detail)

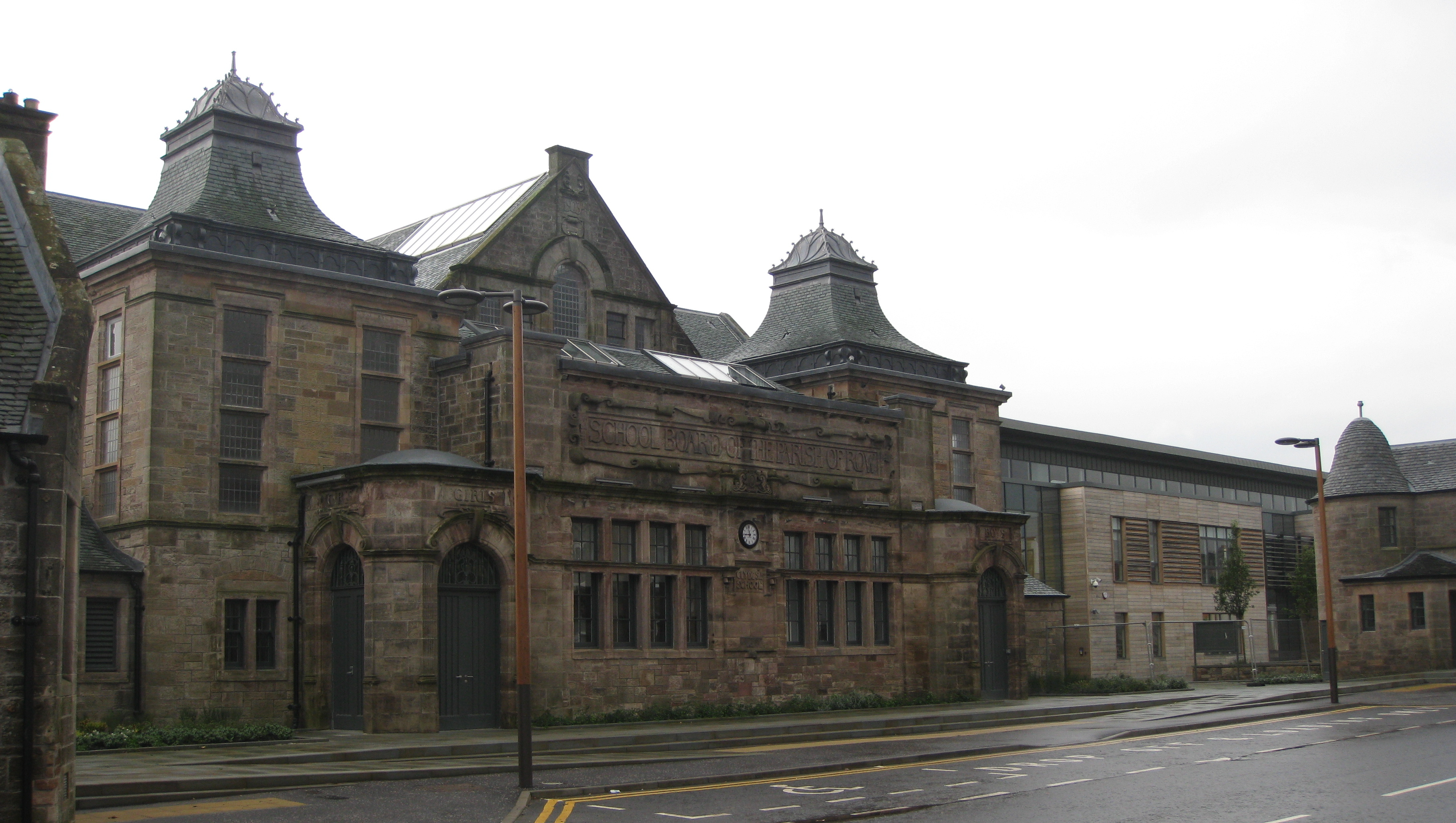
Clyde Street School, Helensburgh

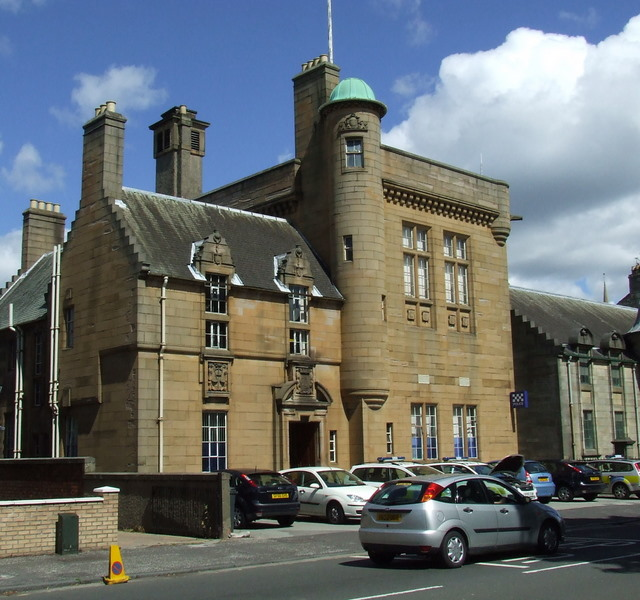
Renfrew Police Chambers

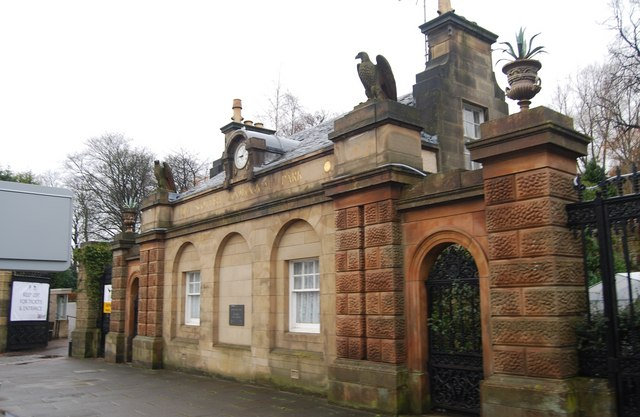
Edinburgh Zoo - entrance gate

He was born on 3 May 1862 at 7 Berkley Terrace in Glasgow, the youngest son of Margaret Hunter and her husband, Andrew Paterson (1819-1907) of James Paterson & Co, muslin manufacturers in the Bridgeton district o the city. His older brothers included James Paterson who later became an artist in the group known as the Glasgow Boys.

Alexander was educated at the Western Academy and Glasgow Academy. He studied for the church at Glasgow University graduating MA in 1882, but he wanted to be an artist, like his brother James. His parents could not support two sons in such a risky profession so a compromise was made and he agreed to study architecture at the Ecole des Beaux Artes under Jean Louis Pascal in Paris from 1883 to 1886, staying at least some of this time with James.

He returned to Scotland in 1886 and went to work for John Burnet & Son at 167 St Vincent Street, Glasgow, alongside John James Burnet (who had also studied in Paris) the Burnets being family friends.

He gained a reputation as an architectural illustrator. In 1890 he was elected an Associate of the Royal Institute of British Architects (ARIBA). In 1891 he moved to work in the more modern practice of Aston Webb and Ingress Bell, working at Portland Place, London on the South Kensington Museum. Late in 1891 he set up his own practice in Glasgow at 136 Wellington Street.

In 1896 he was unsuccessful in the competition for the Glasgow School of Art (won by Charles Rennie Mackintosh) and perhaps due to this he took a break for a study tour in the USA, also visiting his university friend Stewart Henbest Capper, who was then the head of the School of Architecture at McGill University in Montreal in Canada.

In 1900, largely financed by his father, he began building his own house in Helensburgh: "The Long Croft" on Rossdhu Drive which included studios for both his wife and himself and ample room for entertaining. The property is now a category-A listed building. Over the entrance lintel the doorway bears a central crest and the words “A house that God doth oversee is grounded and watched as well as can be — Salve Bene Dicite”.

In 1903 he merged with Campbell Douglas to form "Campbell Douglas & Paterson", the far older Campbell Douglas giving kudos to the name. Douglas was already semi-retired at the creation of the firm and did no work after 1906 but continued in name in Paterson's practice. The practice moved to Douglas's larger premises at 266 St Vincent Street. From at least 1911 he was a close friend of Robert Lorimer.

In 1906 Paterson was elected President of the Royal Institute of Architects in Scotland.

As with most British architects, works totally dried up during the First World War. By the end of the war Paterson's style was seen as outdated and he received very few commissions. He gained a reputation for designing war memorials, but this work was largely for love rather than money. Meaningful architectural commissions did not recommence until 1928.

Of note, he designed memorials to two of his close friends who died: that to Stewart Henbest Capper in Cairo, and that to Robert Lorimer in St Giles Cathedral in Edinburgh.

From 1930 he sat on the board of the Ancient Monuments Committee. In 1936 his larynx was removed due to cancer of the throat. He survived but had to relearn how to speak. He then retired completely (he was semi-retired from 1928) and spent his leisure time doing watercolours.

He died at home in Helensburgh on 10 July 1947. He is buried in Helensburgh Cemetery with a Celtic cross designed by William Leiper as his monument.

== Artistic recognition ==
Paterson was portrayed several times: by his wife, Maggie Hamilton, by his brother James Paterson and by several of his artist and architect friends.

Historic Environment Scotland (Canmore) hold the A N Paterson Collection which includes a wide range of his architectural drawings, artworks and photographs both at home and on holiday.

== Main works ==
Yarrow Kirk

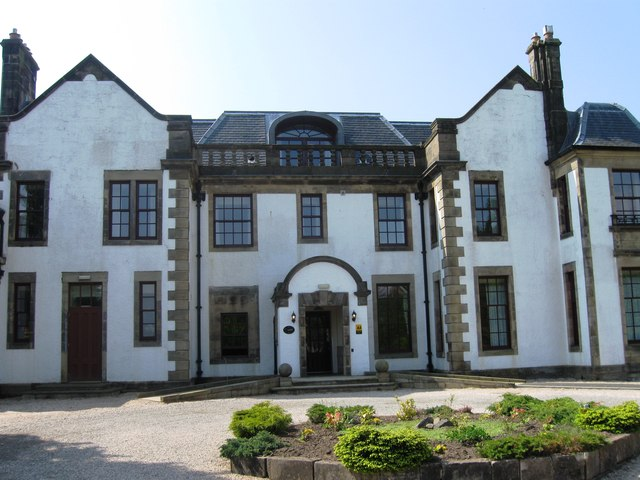
Gleddoch House

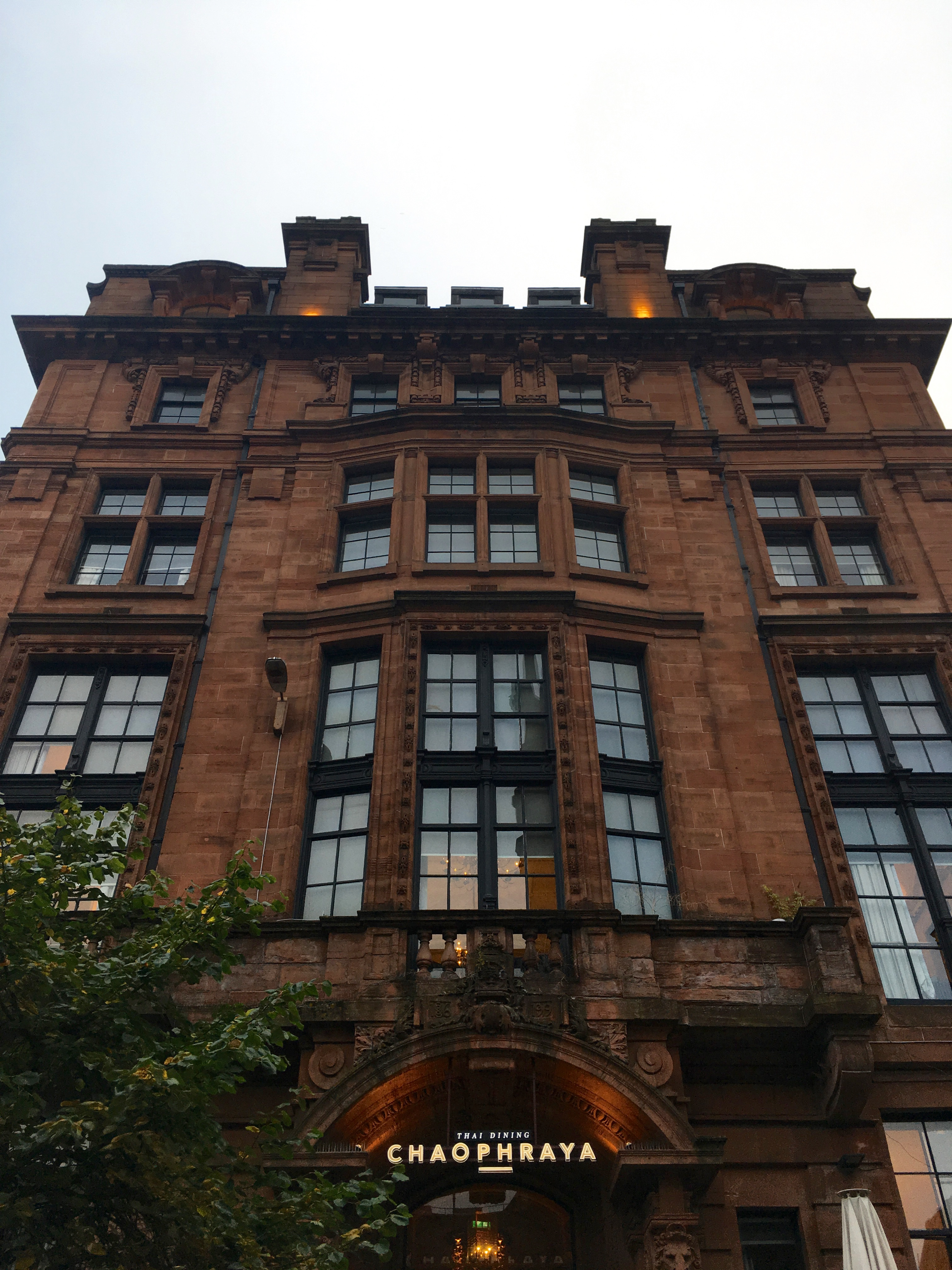
Liberal Club, Nelson Mandela Place, Glasgow, 1

- Grave of Sir James Guthrie and his wife Lady Guthrie in Rhu churchyard. (dnk)
- Plaque to William Wordsworth at Yarrow (dnk)
- Reredos at Caddonfoot Parish Church (dnk)
- Library for the Solicitors of the Supreme Court in Edinburgh on the Cowgate (1888)
- Work on South Kensington Museum for Aston & Webb (1891)
- Arngask Library and Institute (1892)
- Dispensary, Glasgow Eye Infirmary (1893)
- Interior remodelling of Lesmahagow Parish Church (1894)
- Four villas on Millig Street in Helensburgh (1895)
- 1 Rowallan Street, Helensburgh (1895)
- West and East Gables, Helensburgh (1895)
- Session house at Lesmahagow (1897)
- Uplands in West Kilbride (1897)
- Boarding houses (Jeffrey House and Scott House) for Edinburgh Academy, Kinnear Road, Edinburgh (1898)
- Bank Street UF Church and Hall, Clydebank (1899)
- Art gallery at 5 Old Bond Street in London (probably through Alexander Reid) (1900)
- West Kilbride Public Hall (1900)
- Golfhill Public School, Dennistoun (1900) - now abandoned
- Lagarie (villa) in Rhu (1901)
- Long Croft, Helensburgh (1901 for himself)
- Clyde Street School, Helensburgh (1902)
- Barr & Stroud Optical Instrument Works, Anniesland (1903)
- Moor Gate (villa), Helensburgh (1903)
- Lochboisdale Parish Church (pre 1904)
- Fire Station, Helensburgh (1905)
- Rhu Hall and Reading Room (1905)
- Hapland (villa) in Mauchline (1905)
- Colquhoun Arms Hotel, Arrochar, Argyll (1906)
- National Bank of Scotland, St Enoch Square, Glasgow (1906)
- Liberal Club, Nelson Mandela Place, Glasgow (1907)
- Drinking fountain at Logie Kirk (1907)
- Yarrow Village Institute (1908)
- Drum Millig (villa), Helensburgh (c.1908)
- Renfrew County Police Chambers (1910)
- Courtallam (villa) Helensburgh (1910)
- Tenement 271-285 Dumbarton Road, Glasgow (1910)
- Arrochar Hotel, Arrochar, Argyll (1911)
- Albion Car Works Offices, Scotstoun, Glasgow (1912)
- Scalesheugh (villa) Cumberland (c.1912)
- Whincroft (villa) Helensburgh (c.1913)
- Elmbank and Strone (villas) Dunoon (1914)
- National Bank of Scotland, Gourock (1914)
- Memorial to William Millie Dow (1843–1918) in Dysart churchyard
- Scalesheugh Mausoleum (c.1922)
- Gateway and Lodge of Edinburgh Zoo (1923)
- Yarrow Kirk (1923) rebuilding after a fire
- Memorial to Bonar Law, Helensburgh Cemetery (1923)
- Duncan Macpherson Hospital, Gourock (1925)
- Glasgow Savings Bank, Cathcart (1925)
- Tomb of Stewart Henbest Capper in Cairo (1926)
- Gleddoch House, near Langbank (1926) now a hotel
- National Bank of Scotland, Helensburgh (1928)
- Memorial to Robert Lorimer in St Giles Cathedral, Edinburgh (1932)

=== War memorials ===
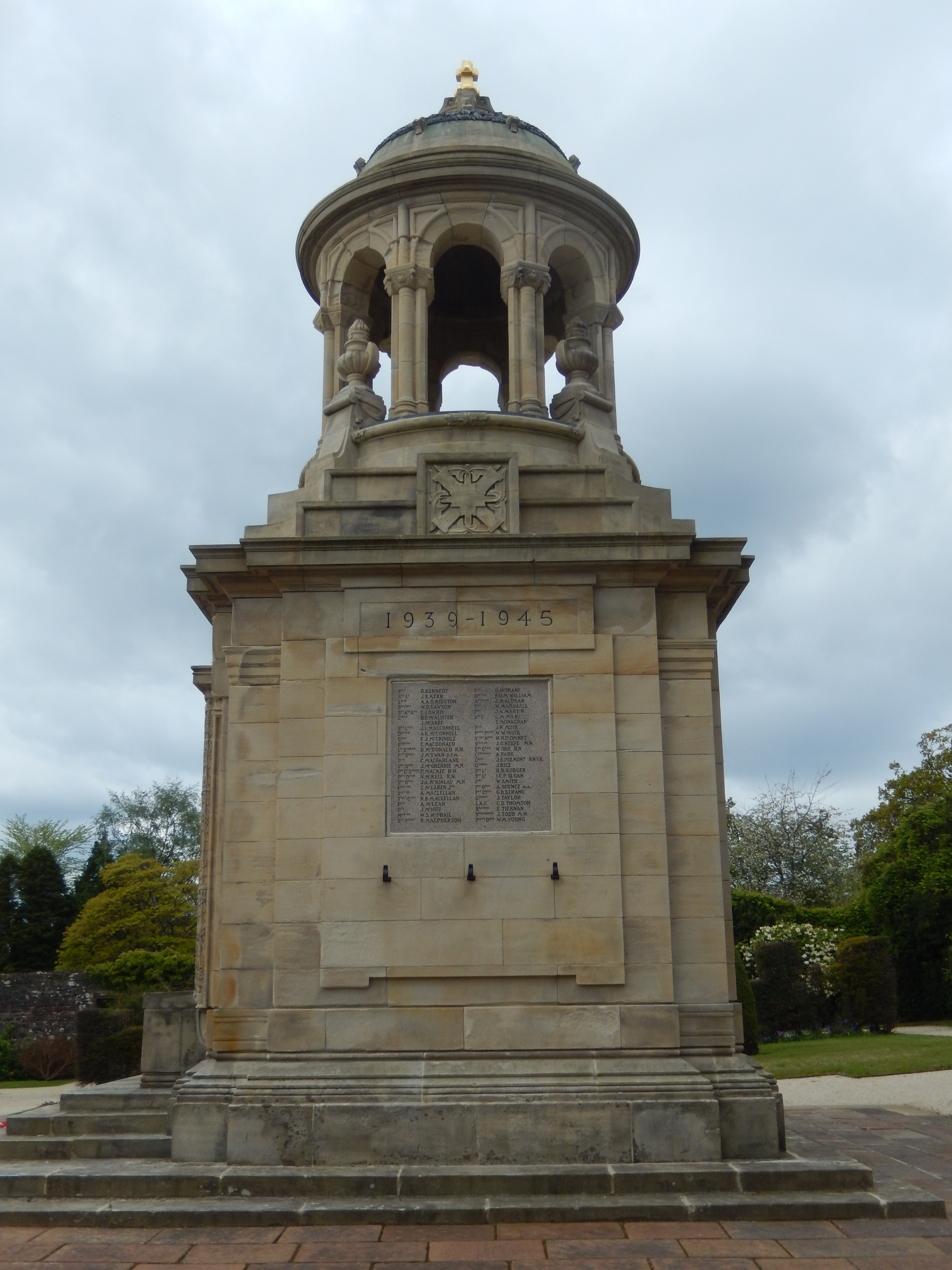
Helensburgh War Memorial

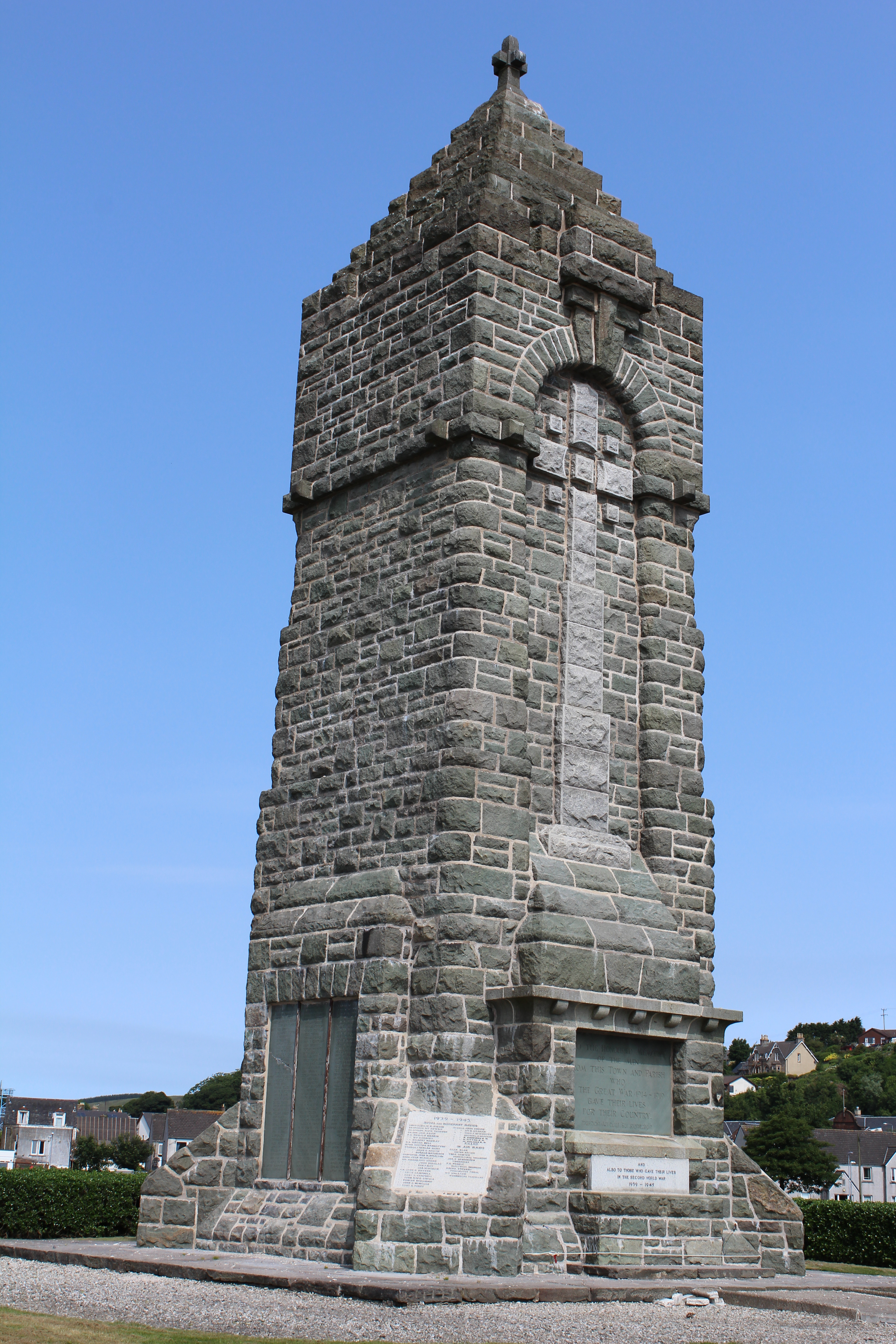
Campbeltown War Memorial

Mainly created 1919 to 1922

- Ancrum War Memorial
- Barr & Stroud War Memorial
- War Memorial, Belmont church, Hillhead
- Bolton Parish Church War Memorial
- Bon Accord Works War Memorial, Yoker, Glasgow
- Cathcart Parish Church (1920)
- Glasgow Dairy Company Ltd
- Killean and Kilkenzie
- Lennoxtown
- Lesmahagow
- Luss
- National Bank of Scotland, Edinburgh
- St Andrews UF Church, Edinburgh
- St Georges Church, Edinburgh
- West Coates Church, Edinburgh
- Yarrow
- Shandon War Memorial in Gullybridge
- Kippen
- Langside Old Parish Church
- Rhu
- Helensburgh
- Campbeltown
- Glasgow Academy

== Family ==
He was married to the artist Margaret (Maggie) Hamilton (1867–1952), sister of artist James Whitelaw Hamilton, in 1897. They initially lived at "The Turret" on Millig Street in Helensburgh, a house of his own design, moving to Long Croft in 1901.

They had a daughter, the artist Mary Viola Paterson, and son Alistair Hamilton Paterson who rose to the rank of Major General in the British Army.
