= Stewart Henbest Capper =

Scottish architect (1859–1925)

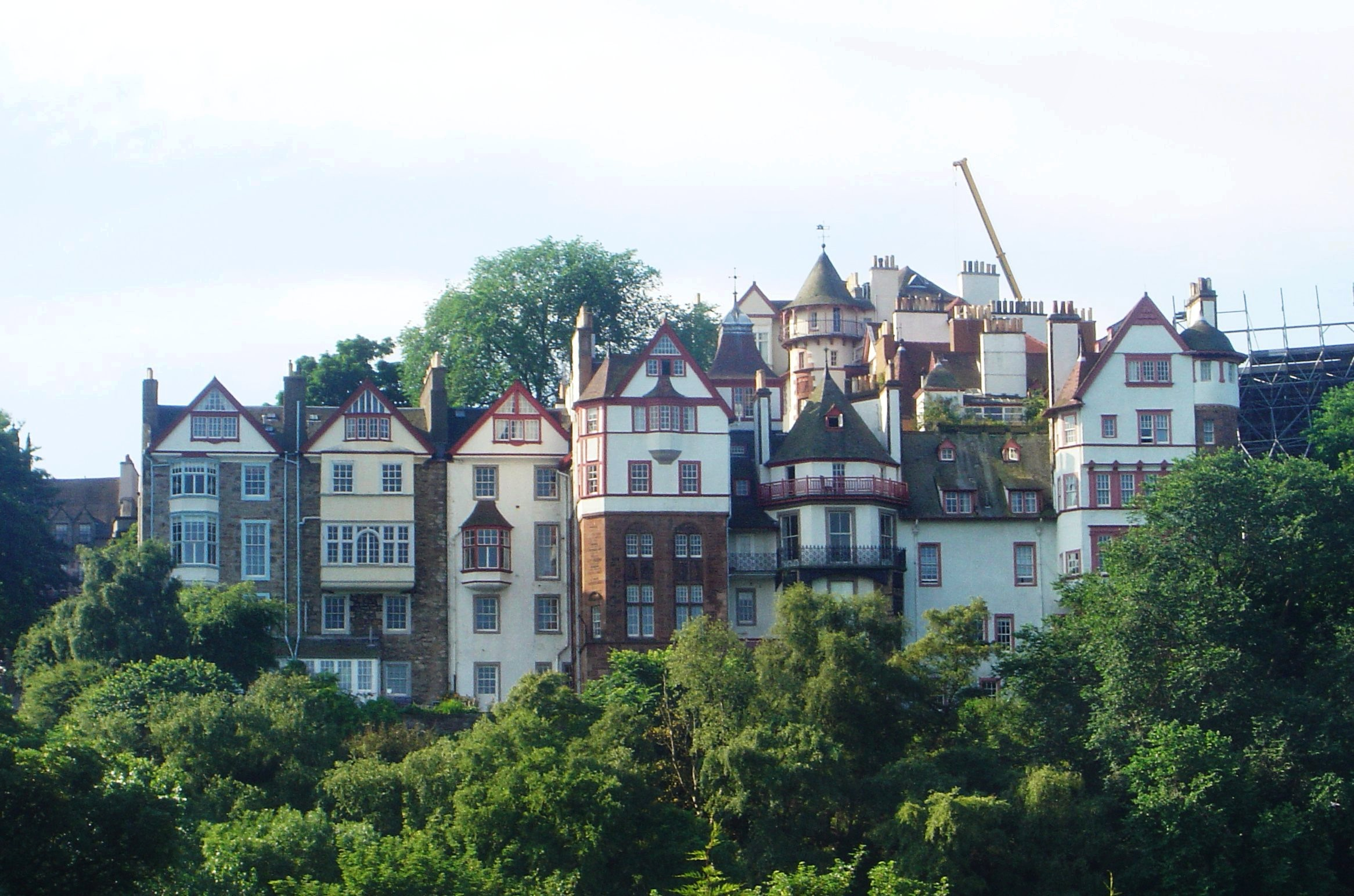
Ramsay Gardens in Edinburgh

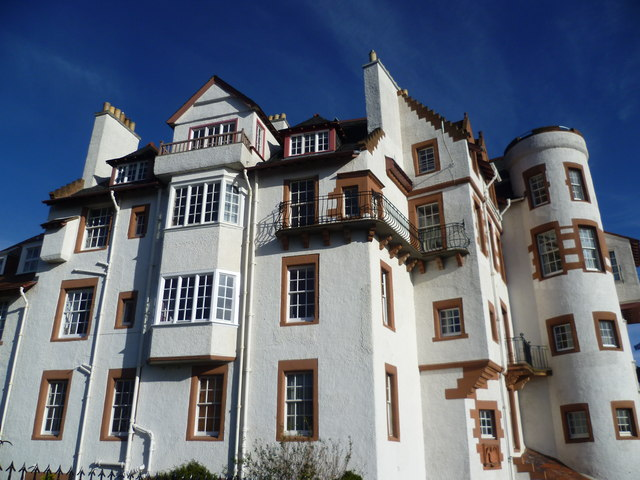
Ramsay Garden as seen from the SW

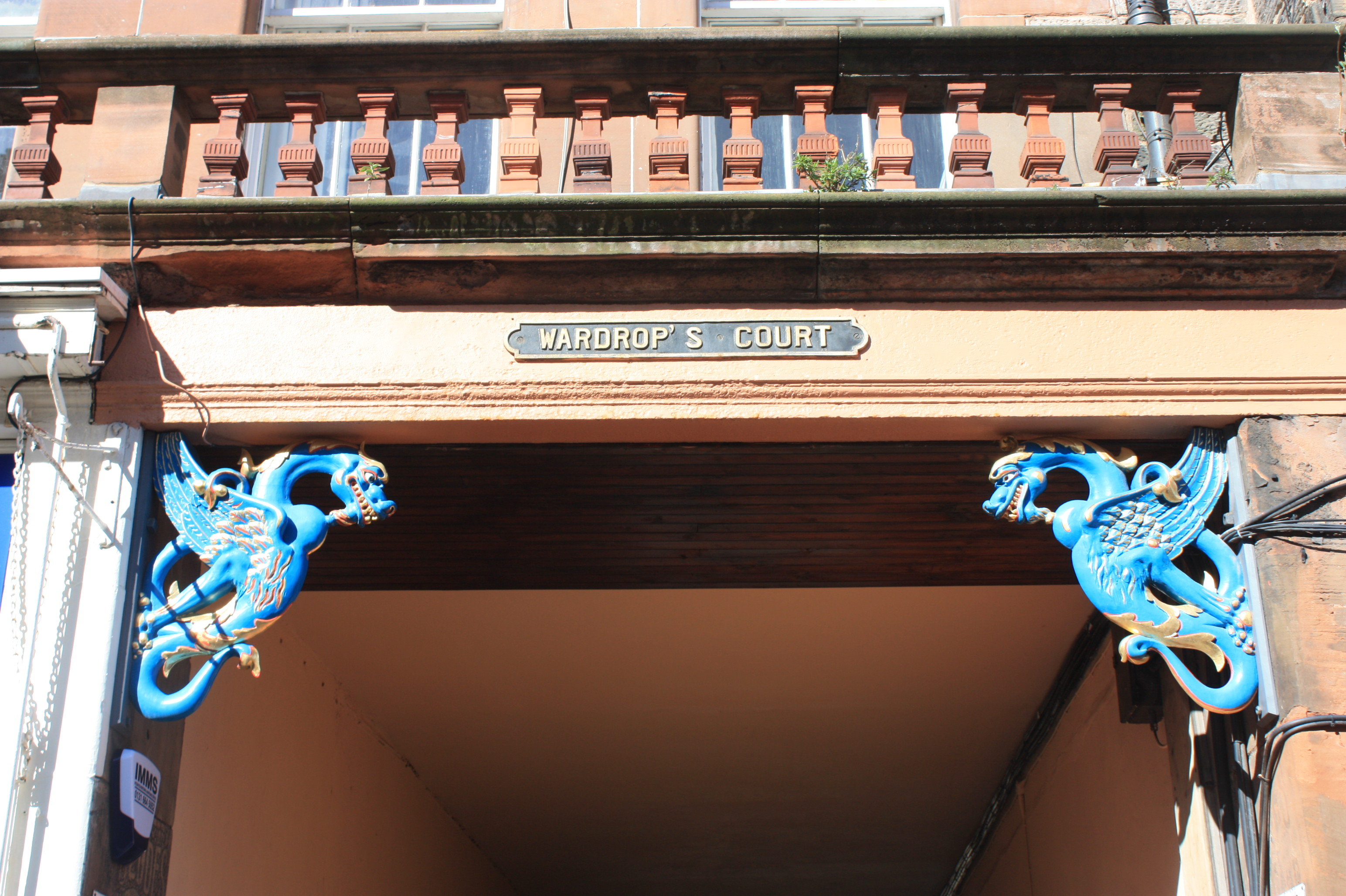
Detail, entrance to Wardrop's Court, Lawnmarket, Edinburgh

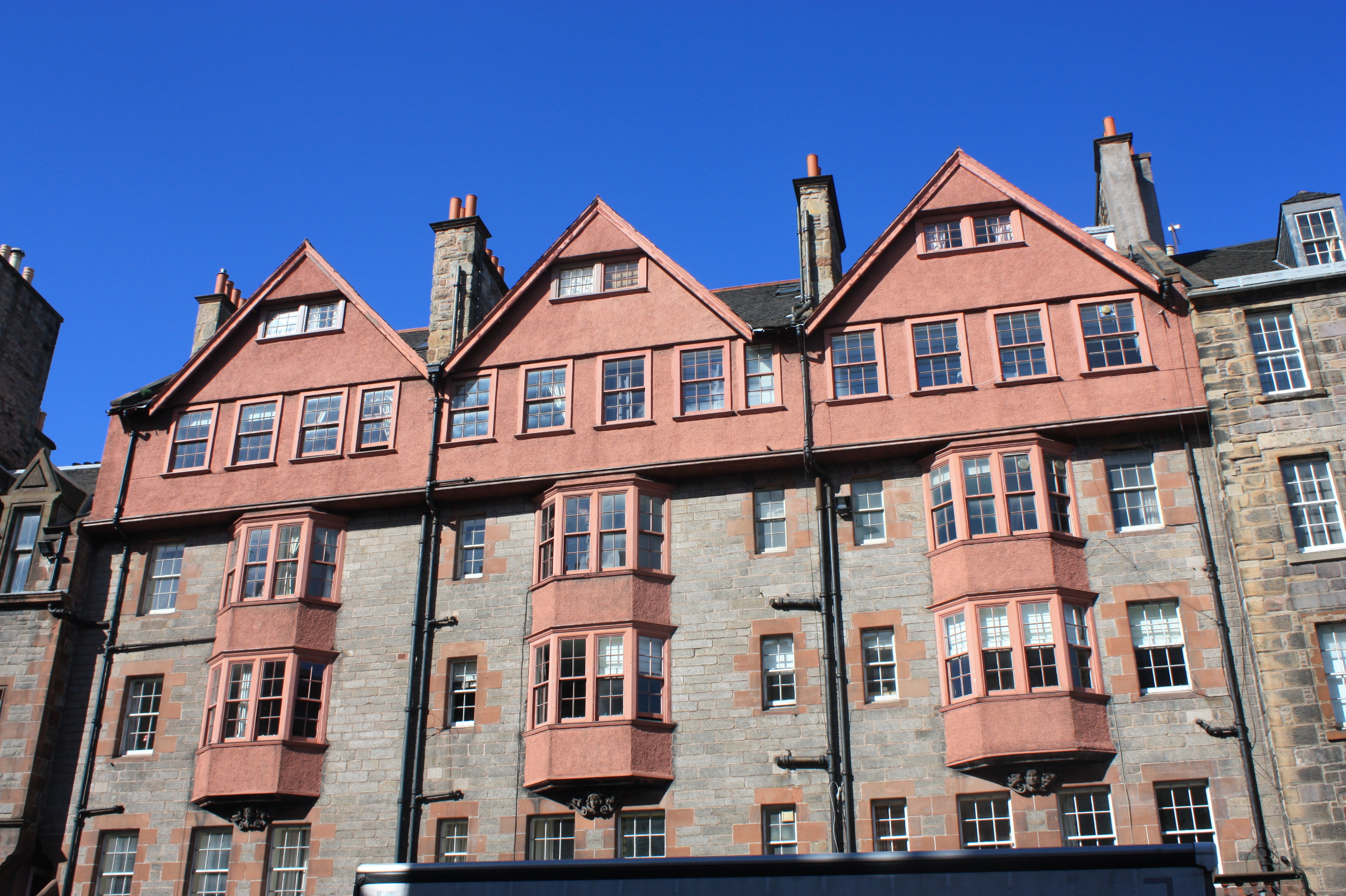
Capper block, Lawnmarket, Edinburgh

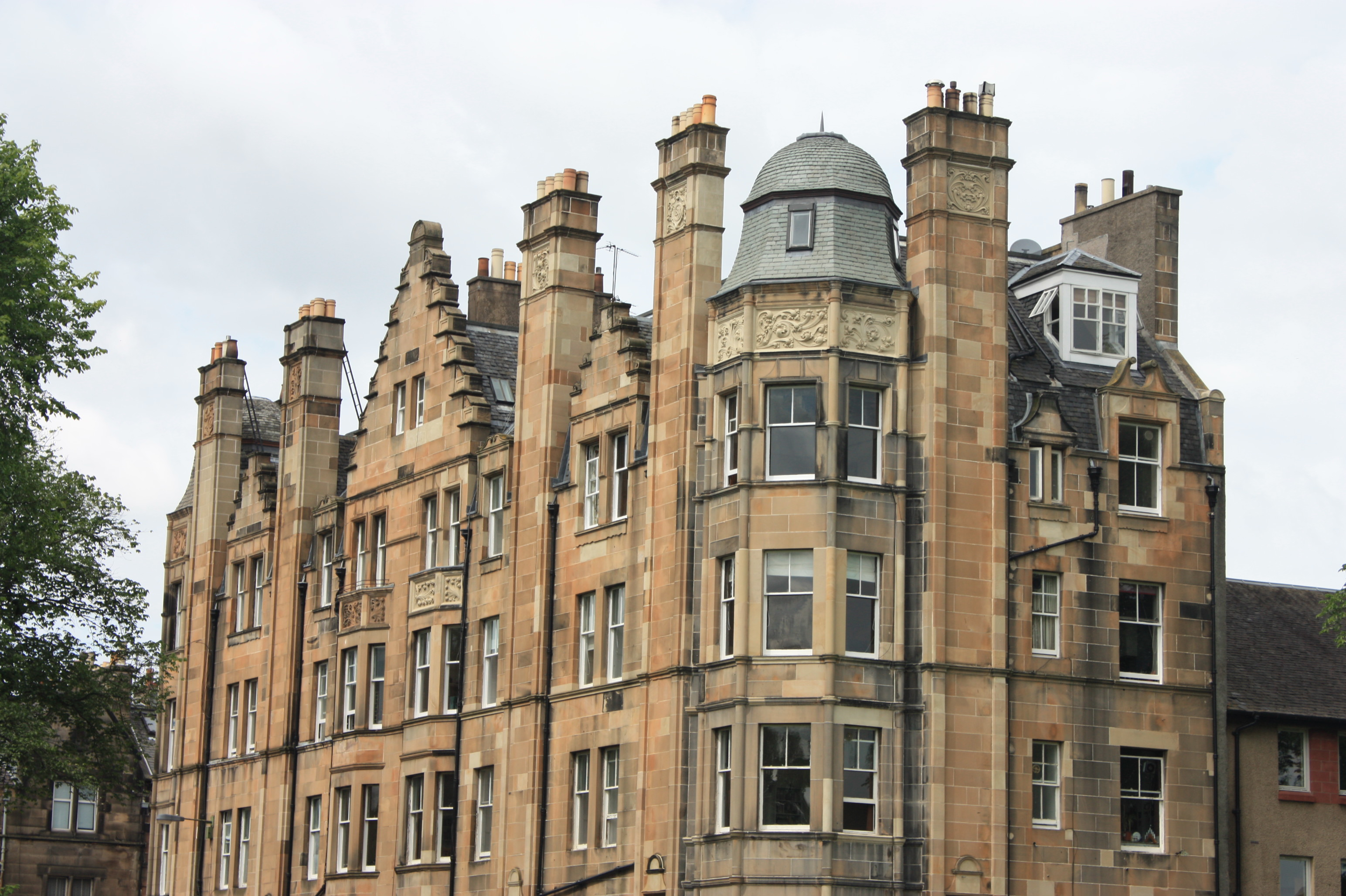
Wrights Buildings, Bruntsfield (detail)

Stewart Henbest Capper (15 December 1859 – 8 January 1925) was a prominent architect in the Arts and Crafts style closely associated with Sir Patrick Geddes with much of his work mislabelled as Geddes'. Due to ill health he did not achieve much that he might have, and his contemporary Sydney Mitchell completed much of his most public works. His style cleverly mimics medieval and Renaissance details, and, as it sometimes includes either original or faked medieval date-stones, is regularly accepted as being several centuries older than its true age.

In later life he is remembered as Professor Capper due to his academic role at McGill University in Canada. This is often remembered more than for his work in Scotland, and much of his due fame has been laid on the shoulders of his clients and those who completed his works.

== Early life ==
Born in Douglas, Isle of Man, the son of Jasper John Capper (1820–1918), he was raised in Upper Clapton in London until his family moved to Edinburgh when Stewart was nine years old, either just before or just after the death of his mother, Harriet Millington Jackson (1820–1870). His father remarried soon after the death, to Anna Coventry Blyth. The family lived at 1 Beaufort Road in the Grange district.

Stewart, and his two brothers, were educated at the Royal High School, where he was dux for the academic year 1874/5. At 16 he then won a place at Edinburgh University and gained a First Class Degree in Classics. The studies included a period attending the university of Heidelberg in Germany, from which it may be concluded that he spoke German competently.

== Architecture ==
Capper then decided to pursue a life in architecture and received a post in the office of John Burnet & Son in Glasgow in 1884. However, ill-health forced him to abandon this role, and he chose instead to act in the role of personal tutor to the only son of Sir Robert Morier a diplomat in Portugal, also acting as Morier's personal secretary. Here he learned both Portuguese and Spanish. After a relatively brief period in this role he moved to Paris to attend the Ecole des Beaux-Arts as a pupil of Jean-Louis Pascal. He stayed here for 4 years of study, during which time he befriended Alexander Nisbet Paterson, Frank Worthington Simon and John Keppie.

Following the death of his father and inheritance of the house at 1 Beaufort Road, he returned to Edinburgh in 1887 to work as assistant to George Washington Browne where he worked until 1891 whereafter he moved totally to his own practice which he had established in 1888. During this period with Browne he had input into the design of the Central Library on George IV Bridge, the Royal Hospital for Sick Children, Wright's Buildings on Bruntsfield Place and the Solicitors Buildings on the Cowgate.

In his own practice he drew in his old friend from Pascal's, Frank Worthington Simon as a partner. Together they quickly came to the attention of the profession, winning a competition for the Hope Chapel in Wigan, and in 1890 Simon exhibited as part of the Edinburgh International Exhibition working with the architect/artist William Alan Carter.

The partnership with Simon was brief and dissolved in 1892, and Capper thereafter involved himself closely in the project ideas of Patrick Geddes who sought to make good use of abandoned and derelict properties in Edinburgh's Old Town to house students for the "Town and Gown University Settlement", which although now viewed largely as a philanthropic and conservationist gesture this was primarily as a money-making exercise. This involved Capper hugely extending the previously very small Georgian terrace at Ramsay Gardens to create a hugely picturesque building now an iconic part of Edinburgh's townscape. This (although now hard to believe) was done as low-cost student housing but incorporated a house for Geddes himself within it. Capper's ill health returned during the project and over-seeing of the completion and final detailing was done by Sydney Mitchell who is often incorrectly given credit for the full project. Together with the Ramsay Gardens project Capper also remodelled Riddle's Court, James Court and several Lawnmarket blocks as part of the same University Settlement concept. During this period Capper employed Ramsay Traquair as his assistant.

== Academic life ==
When the Edinburgh College of Art was established in 1892 Capper was one of the initial lecturers in Architecture.

In 1896 Capper gave up his overseeing of the various projects passed to him by Geddes. At this stage most were complete other than Ramsay Gardens. Given its enormous prominence in the townscape it was probably reluctantly that he let Mitchell complete his magnum opus. However, Prof Gerard Baldwin Brown had nominated him to be the first Professor of Architecture at McGill University in Montreal. This was also agreed by the principal of McGill, William Peterson. This Capper accepted believing it would improve his health, but the job was conditional upon him ceasing all other jobs, so this alone may have been the reason for him abandoning the Ramsay Gardens project.

Capper pushed for architecture to be a university-learnt skill rather than the established practice of being "articled" to an existing architect to learn the skill.

In 1903 he returned to Britain, taking a chair as Professor of Architecture in Victoria University of Manchester. His successor in McGill University, Percy Erskine Hobbs, left McGill in 1909 and Capper expressed an interest in returning, but the position was instead filled, rather ironically, by Capper's former assistant, Ramsay Traquair, and Capper continued in Manchester until 1912.

While in Canada, Capper had served as part-time captain in the Canadian Field Artillery. In Manchester he chose a similar role and rose to brevet major in the Officer Training Corps of the university. His time from 1912 to the outbreak of World War I is unclear but at that point he joined the Manchester Volunteers and was dispatched to Gallipoli. Here though he was declared unfit for service, another reflection on his ill-health. Thereafter he attained a post of Military Censor in Cairo, Egypt, requiring him to learn Arabic. At the end of the war he continued in a similar role in Cairo working for the Ministry of the Interior.

Capper died of a heart attack while in the Anglo-American Hospital in Cairo on 8 January 1925. His funeral was attended by Lord Allenby, who was in Cairo at the time, and by officials from the Egyptian government. However, no Scottish friends or family attended, because they were unable to reach Cairo in the customary 24 hours permitted in Arabic countries between death and funeral. As he was unmarried and had no heirs, Capper left his money all to pay additional stipends to teachers at both McGill University and Manchester University. His tomb was designed by architect and life-long friend Alexander Nisbet Paterson.

== Principal works ==
- Hope Chapel, Wigan (1888) (with Frank Worthington Simon)
- Tenements at Wright's Buildings, Bruntsfield, Edinburgh (working for George Washington Browne) (1887)
- Edinburgh Central Library (working for George Washington Browne) (1887–88)
- Edinburgh Hospital for Sick Children (working for George Washington Browne) (1888–89)
- 3-7 James Court/493-495 Lawnmarket, Edinburgh (1892)
- 453-461 Lawnmarket, including Lady Stair's House, Edinburgh (1892)
- 11-16 Ramsay Gardens (1892–93) (5-10 completed by Sydney Mitchell)
- Blairhoyle Masonic Lodge, Thornhill, Stirlingshire (1893)
- Restoration of Riddle's Court and buildings fronting Lawnmarket (1893)
- Blackie House on Lawnmarket (1894)
- Conversion of Craigleith House, Edinburgh to a hospital for consumptives (1894)
- 48 Inverleith Place, Edinburgh (1895) (Capper's sole major commission for a private villa)
- New lodge house for Blairhoyle House, Stirlingshire (1895)
- Golf Clubhouse for Edinburgh Ladies Golf Club (1895)
- Whitworth Laboratory, Manchester University (1909)
