= Frank Worthington Simon =

British architect

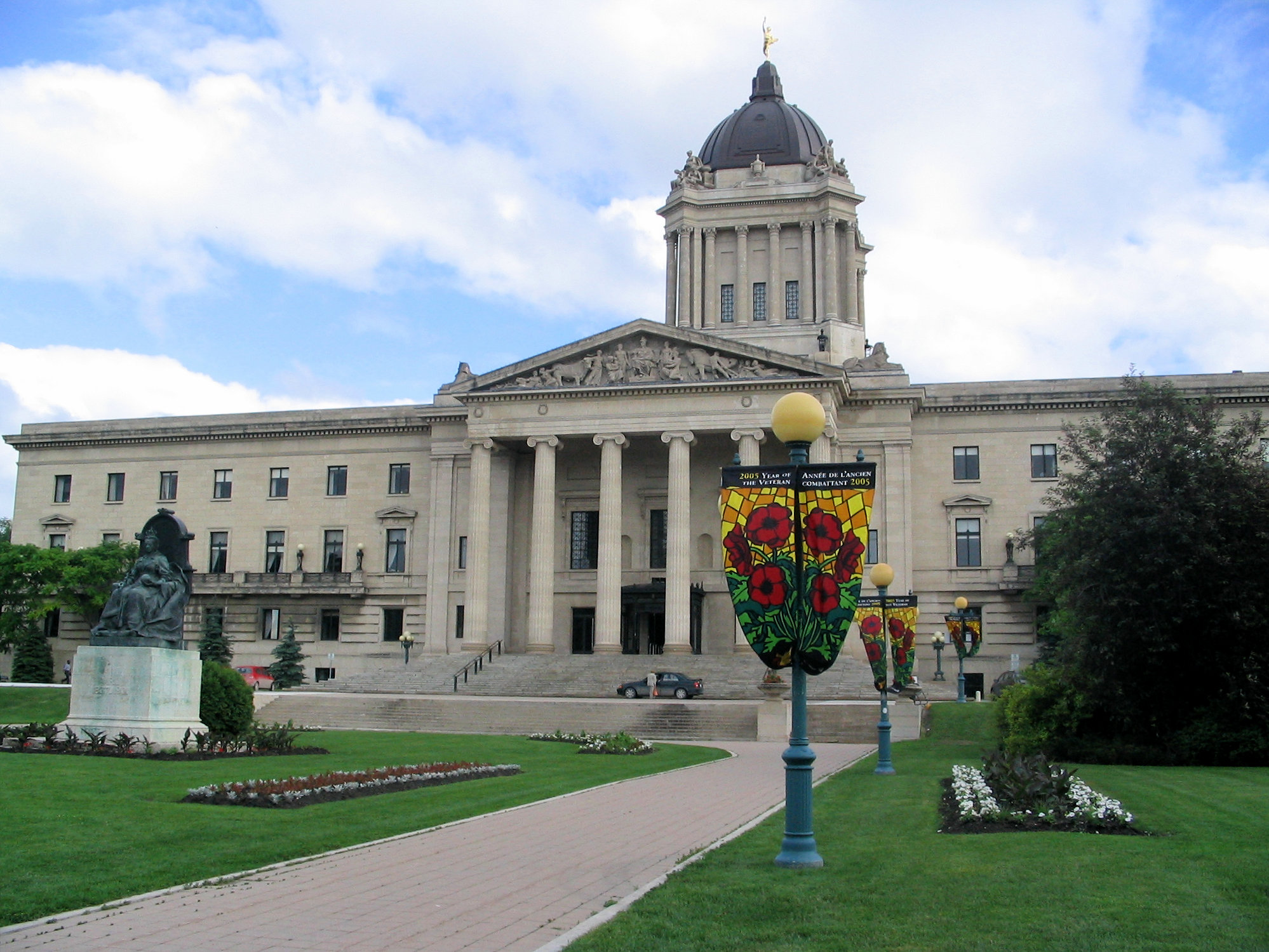
Manitoba Legislative Building by Frank Worthington Simon

Frank Lewis Worthington Simon (31 March 1862 – 19 May 1933) was a British architect working in the Arts and Crafts style. In Scotland, he was sufficiently noteworthy as to be commissioned by Queen Victoria to remodel Balmoral Castle. In later life he worked in Canada and is best remembered for the Manitoba Legislative Building.

== Life ==
He was born in Darmstadt, Grand Duchy of Hesse, the son of Dr David Worthington Simon.

He was educated at Tettenhall College in Wolverhampton and King Edward VI Grammar School in Birmingham before being articled to John Cotton in Birmingham in 1879. In 1882 he briefly worked with Jethro Anstice Cossins before going to Paris to study at the Ecole des Beaux-Arts under Jean-Louis Pascal in 1883. He spent one year here sharing rooms with John Keppie and Stewart Henbest Capper and also befriending Alexander Nisbet Paterson.

He then returned to Scotland to work with Burnet Son and Campbell in 1886 and later moved to Wardrop & Anderson.

From around 1885 he also had his own studio at 8 York Place in Edinburgh.

In 1887 he formed his own practice in partnership with his friend Stewart Henbest Capper.

In 1890, under the guidance of Robert Rowand Anderson he became one of the founding fathers of Edinburgh College of Art and he and Capper shared the role of teaching architecture there.

In 1898 he brought Alexander Hunter Crawford, who was connected to the Edinburgh company of Crawfords Biscuits, into partnership and the practice moved to 36 Hanover Street. In 1899 this merged with Robert Rowand Anderson’s practice to create Anderson, Simon & Crawford which lasted until 1902 until reverting to its former form and moved to 10 Randolph Place.

In 1903 the partnership with Crawford ended and Simon moved to Liverpool where he formed a new partnership with Huon Arthur Matear. Jointly they created the huge Liverpool Cotton Exchange in 1905 (remodelled 1960). In 1910 Henry Boddington, of the Boddingtons Brewery family, was brought into the partnership.

In 1912 the partnership won the hugely important competition for the Manitoba Legislative Building in Winnipeg, Canada and Simon began regular visits to Canada. He employed Septimus Warwick specifically to help on the Manitoba job and act as job architect on site, a role required until 1920.

Simon married Lavinia Florence Colefax of California and died in Mentone, California in 1933.

== Principal works ==
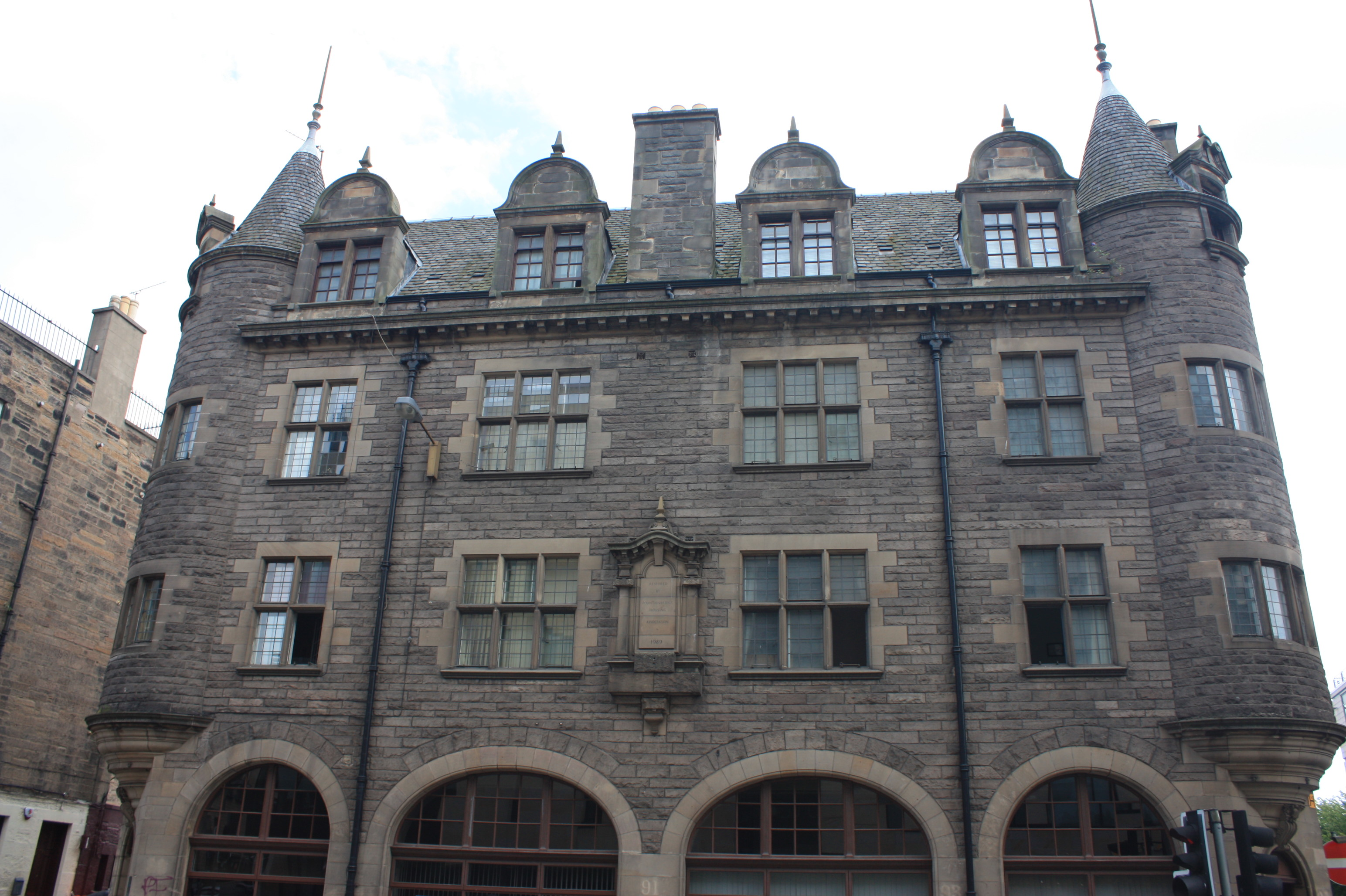
Industrial Brigade Building, Fountainbridge, Edinburgh

- Outwood, 8 Mortonhall Road, Edinburgh (1888) (for his own father)
- Hope Chapel, Wigan (competition winner) (1888)
- Innerleithen Congregational Church (1889)
- Buildings for the Edinburgh International Exhibition (Meggetland) (1890)
- Whiteinch Orphanage, Broomhill, Glasgow (1890)
- Villa at 32 Inverleith Place, Edinburgh (1892)
- Macfadyen Memorial Church, Chorlton-cum-Hardy, Manchester (1892)
- Edinburgh Dental School and Hospital (1894) (demolished 1952)
- Gorgie Evangelical Union Church, Edinburgh (1894)
- Robertson's Court, Edinburgh (1894)
- Trysull School, Institute and All Saints Church (1896-7)
- The Red House Nurses Home, Edinburgh Royal Infirmary (1897) demolished 2004
- Villa at 2 South Gillsland Road, Edinburgh (1897)
- Industrial Brigade Building, Fountainbridge, Edinburgh (1898)
- Brizlee, villa on Colinton Road (now 93/95), Edinburgh (1899)
- Feuing (housing layout) for the Braid estate in Edinburgh (1899)
- Feuing (housing layout) for the Fettes estate in Edinburgh (1899)
- Inchinnan Parish Church (1899)
- Perth Evangelical Union Church (1899)
- Remodelling of Library Senate Room, University of St. Andrews (1899)
- Rosefield Cottage, 4 Cargil Terrace, Edinburgh (1899)
- Dalmeny Street Drill Hall, Leith, Edinburgh (1900)
- Claremont Congregational Church, Blackpool (1901)
- Pearce Memorial Hall and Institute, Govan (1901)
- Alterations and works on the estate at Balmoral Castle (1902)
- Dunalistair House, Dreghorn, Edinburgh (1902)
- Inchinnan Parish Church Hall (1902)
- Remodelling of Trysull Manor (1902)
- Liverpool Cotton Exchange (1905) note-front remodelled c.1960
- Orleans House, Liverpool (1907)
- Manitoba Legislative Building, Winnipeg (1912–20)
- Arts Faculty Building, University of Liverpool (1913)
- Railway viaduct, Banff, Alberta, Canada (1919)
