= James Whitelaw Hamilton =

Scottish painter (1860–1932)

James Whitelaw Hamilton (1860–1932) RSA, RSW was a Scottish artist, member of the Glasgow School (the Glasgow Boys), of the Royal Scottish Academy (RSA) and of the New English Art Club.

== Career ==
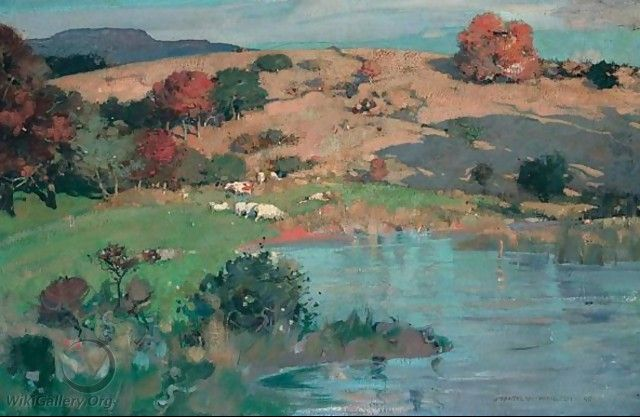
Cattle Grazing in a Meadow, c1910

Hamilton was born in Glasgow, where he studied before moving to Paris, where he became a pupil of Aimé Morot and of Pascal Dagnan-Bouveret. Returning to Scotland in 1884, he spent time at Cockburnspath with other future Glasgow Boys James Guthrie, Joseph Crawhall and Arthur Melville. In 1887 he was elected a member of the New English Art club, exhibiting at their annual exhibitions in London. He also showed regularly with the Glasgow Institute of the Fine Arts, of which he was honorary secretary for many years. He became an associate of the RSA in 1911, and a full academician in 1922. He was also a member of the Royal Scottish Society of Painters in Watercolour (RSW).

In 1897 Hamilton won a gold medal at the Munich International Exhibition, which led to several overseas commissions, including one from King Victor Emmanuel III of Italy, who appointed him a Cavaliere of the Order of the Crown of Italy in 1901. His sister, Maggie Hamilton was also an artist.

In 1900 the art dealer Alexander Reid organised a one-man-show for Hamilton at his gallery at 124 St Vincent Street in central Glasgow.

== At the Venice Biennale ==
Hamilton's work was shown in the British Pavilion at the Venice Biennale at all eight biennales between 1897 and 1910. In 1897, 1899 and 1901 he was part of the Scottish artists' section of the exhibition.

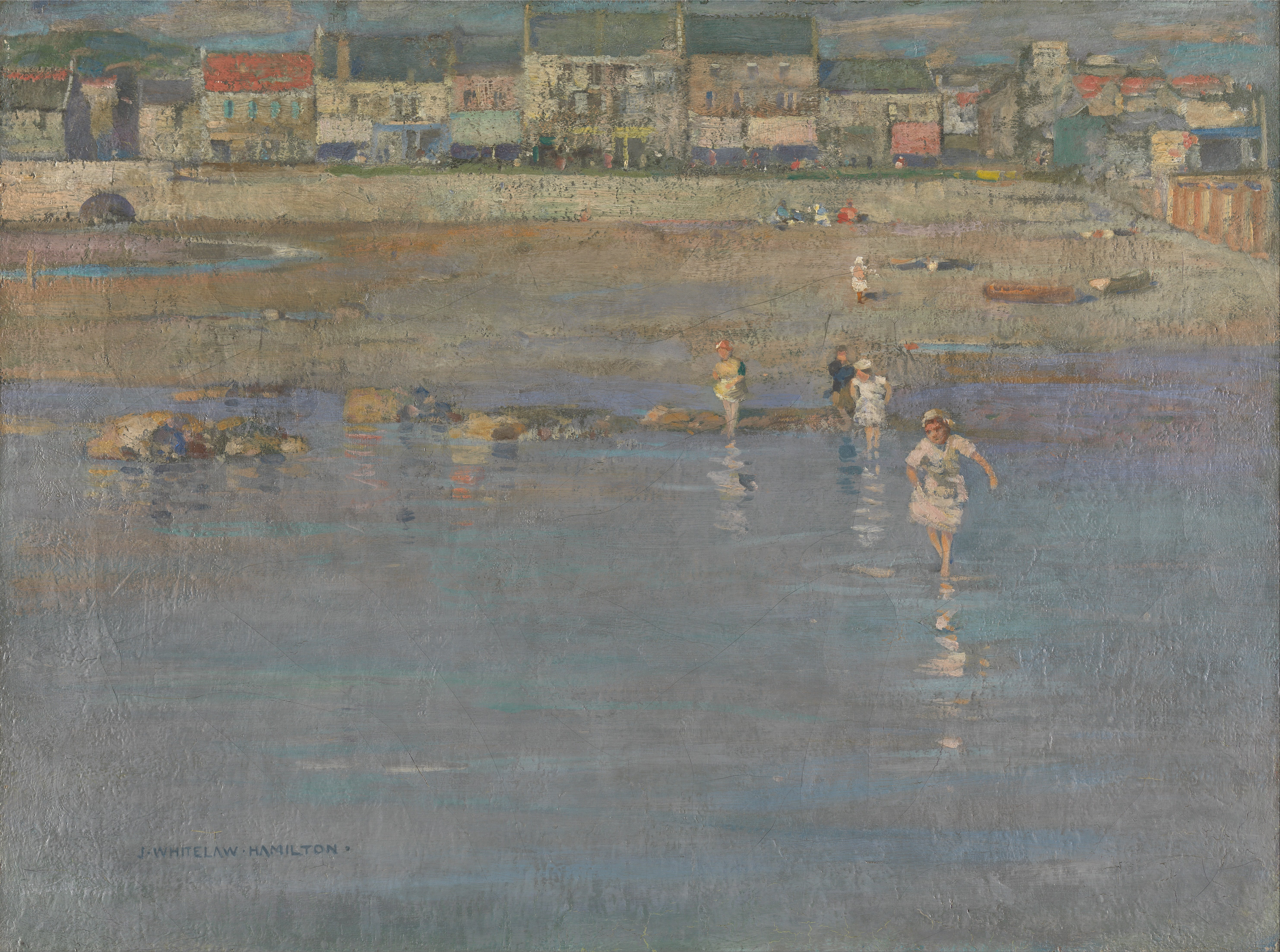
James Whitelaw Hamilton – Ebbing Tide – Google Art Project

== Collections ==
Hamilton's works can be seen in many Scottish, English and overseas public collections, including the following:

- Glasgow Museums & Art Galleries
- University of Dundee
- National Museums Liverpool
- the Hunterian Museum and Art Gallery
- the Royal Scottish Academy
- the Paisley Institute Museum and Art Gallery
- the Neue Pinakothek, Munich
- the Saint Louis Art Museum
- the Carnegie Institute, Pittsburgh

== Family ==
His sister Maggie Hamilton was also an artist. She married the architect A. N. Paterson.
