= Ramsay Garden =

Apartment buildings in Edinburgh, Scotland

Coordinates: 55°56′57″N 3°11′48″W

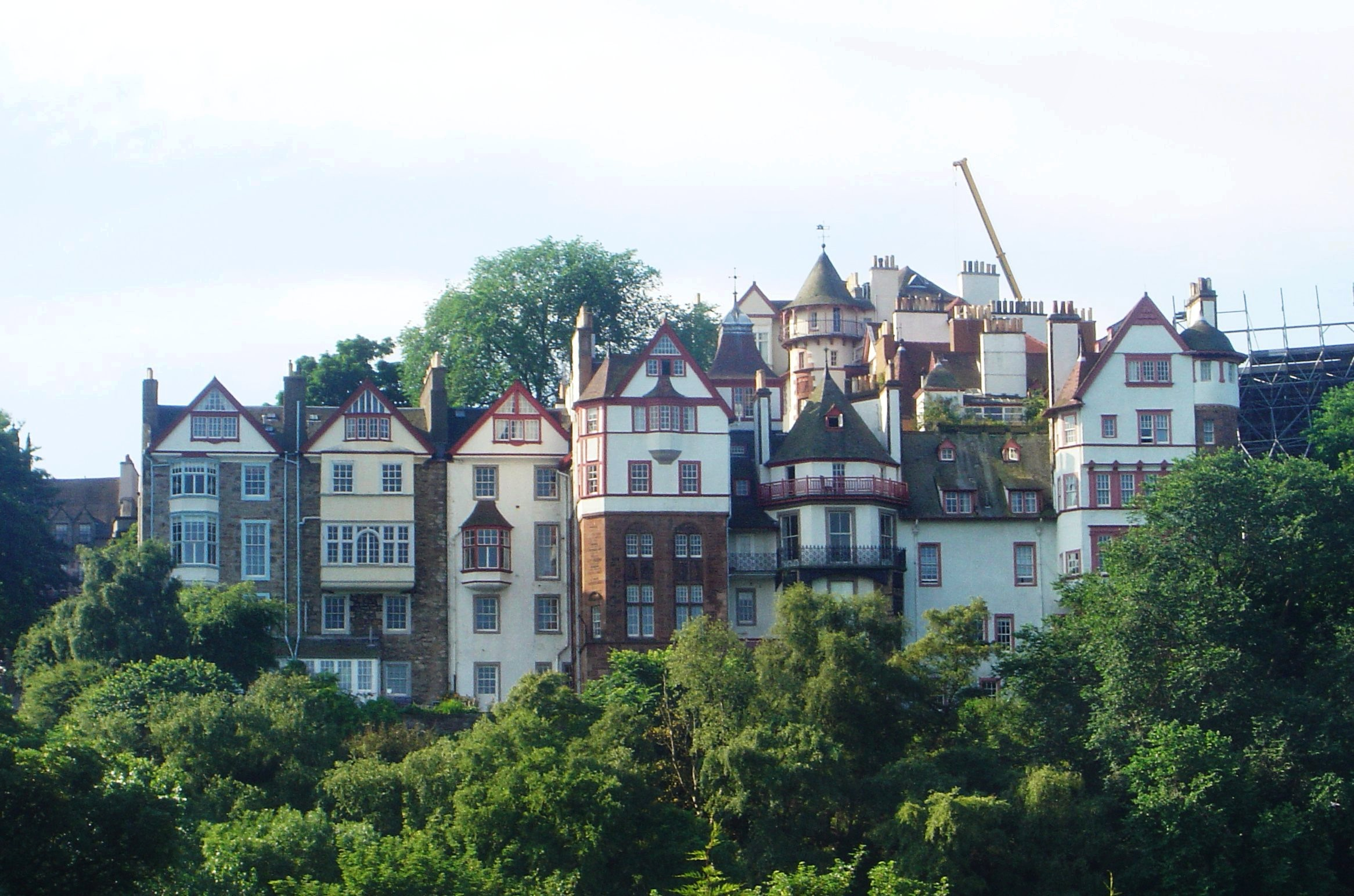
- Ramsay Garden seen from Princes Street
- Interactive map of the Ramsay Garden area

General information
- Architectural style: Scots Baronial
- Location: Castlehill, Edinburgh, Scotland
- Construction started: 1733, 1890
- Completed: 1893
- Client: Patrick Geddes

Design and construction
- Architects: Stewart Henbest Capper, Sydney Mitchell

Ramsay Garden is a block of sixteen private apartment buildings in the Castlehill area of Edinburgh, Scotland. They stand out for their red ashlar and white harled exteriors, and for their prominent position, most visible from Princes Street.

Developed into its current form between 1890 and 1893 by the biologist, botanist and urban planner Patrick Geddes, Ramsay Garden started out as Ramsay Lodge, an octagonal house built by the poet and wig-maker Allan Ramsay the Elder in 1733. The house was also known variously as Ramsay Hut and Goosepie House (due to the roof shape). It was complemented by the addition of Ramsay Street, a short row of simple Georgian Houses in 1760. The latter (in revamped form) stand on the north side of the access to the inner courtyard.

== History ==
Geddes' work on Ramsay Garden began in the context of an urban renewal project that he had embarked on in Edinburgh's Old Town. The area had fallen into disrepair, and Geddes hoped both to improve the living conditions of the working class, and to increase the number of wealthier residents. He was also involved in improving buildings for use as student accommodation. To these purposes Geddes rehabilitated a significant number of tenement buildings in slums along the Royal Mile, including Abbey Cottages, Whitehorse Close and Riddle's Court.

The Ramsay Garden development also served these aims. It was partly financed by the prospective buyers of the apartments, and partly by 2000 pounds that Geddes's wife, Anna Morton, had inherited from her father. Geddes engaged the architect Stewart Henbest Capper to remodel Ramsay Lodge, and to build six large new blocks onto it at right angles to each other. By this time Geddes had acquired a position at a university in London, but he continued to supervise the design of Ramsay Garden on his frequent trips to Edinburgh. The final year of building work was overseen by Sydney Mitchell, who had taken over as architect, due to Capper's poor health. and was also permitted to add some additional detailing. The result of these partnerships was a combination of traditional Scottish domestic architecture and a rather fanciful proliferation of balconies, towers and eaves. Geddes referred to Ramsay Garden in later years as the "seven-towered castle I built for my beloved". Guide books like to attribute the bulk of the design to the better-known Sydney Mitchell but the bulk of both the concept and design is that of Capper.

As a result of his own experiences in universities, and inspired by the better student facilities he had seen in Europe, Geddes was also concerned with the provision of quality accommodation for students. By the time Ramsay Garden was being built he had already established other student Halls of Residence in partnership with the Town and Gown Association. By the end of the 19th century he had managed to provide enough housing for more than 200 university students and staff. The Halls of Residence were intended to be self-governing, with responsibility for drawing up house rules left to the students themselves. The Ramsay Lodge section of the Ramsay Garden development was used for this purpose. Murals painted by John Duncan on the walls of the dining and common rooms depicted images from Celtic myth and history. Lectures and seminars were sometimes held on the premises.

Other parts of Ramsay Garden were available to the public. The Geddes family lived in number 14, a twelve-room apartment on the fourth storey. By all accounts it was an impressive residence. The drawing-room was two rooms connected by an archway, with the whole measuring 20 by 40 feet. The sweeping views, which reached as far as the old Kingdom of Fife, could be admired through the bay and turret window spaces at each end. This room was regularly used for large gatherings. Frescoes by Charles Mackie graced the master bedroom. The lease of the apartment was eventually sold to the Town and Gown Association due to Geddes's financial difficulties. Although he later wished to repurchase it, his desire for the apartment to remain in the family was not fulfilled.

Ramsay Lodge was the last of the University Halls to be sold off by the Town and Gown Association. When it was purchased in 1945 by the Commercial Bank of Scotland, it was a condition of sale that the murals be retained. The Bank went on to use the Lodge as a residential hostel and training centre.

== Notable residents ==
- Allan Ramsay (poet)
- Patrick Geddes
- George Clark Stanton RSA

== Present use ==
Ramsay Garden is considered a very desirable address. Despite its position adjacent to the Castle Esplanade and overlooking Princes Street Gardens it is normally very peaceful, particularly in the inner courtyard and upper garden. Some of the apartments are let out as holiday accommodation. It is a minor feature in some guides to Edinburgh.
