= James Paterson (painter) =

Scottish painter (1854–1932)

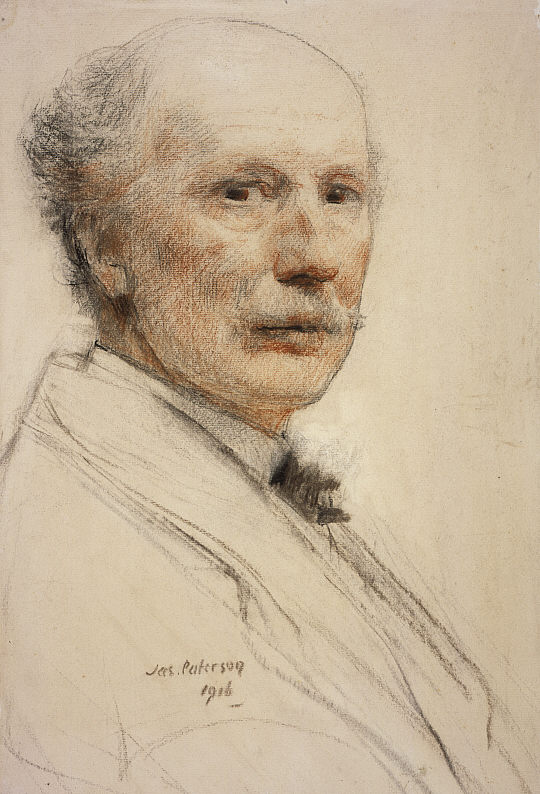
- Self Portrait (1916), National Galleries of Scotland
- Born: 21 August 1854; Blantyre, South Lanarkshire, Scotland
- Died: 25 January 1932 (aged 77); Randolph Crescent, Edinburgh, Scotland
- Education: Glasgow School of Art
- Known for: Painting
- Movement: Glasgow School
- Relatives: Imogen Heap (great-granddaughter)

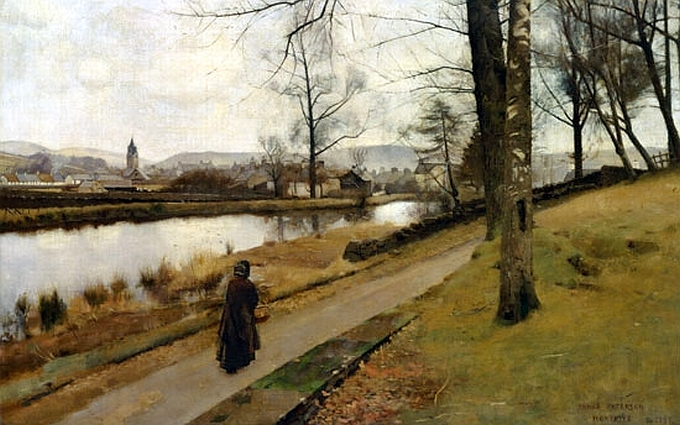
The Last Turning (1885)

James Paterson PRSW RSA RWS (21 August 1854 – 25 January 1932), was a Scottish landscape and portrait painter associated with the Glasgow Boys movement of artists. He is best known for his landscape paintings of Dumfriesshire, where he lived, at Moniaive from 1885 to 1905.

== Life ==
James Paterson was born at Blantyre, near Glasgow on 21 August 1854, the eldest son of Andrew Paterson (1819-1907) and his wife Margaret Hunter (1817-1901). The Hunter family were sewed muslin manufacturers in Glasgow. When his father was orphaned at nineteen his uncle James Hunter appointed him a foreman in his warehouse and took him into partnership two years later at the early age of twenty-one. His father was a good watercolourist as well as one of the earliest amateur photographers in Scotland and most of his family developed artistic interests. James' brother William, born 1859, later became the owner of a gallery in Bond Street, London and his youngest brother Alexander, born 1862, became an architect.

James studied at the Glasgow School of Art under Robert Greenlees. From 1877 he studied in Paris under Louis Jacquesson de La Chevreuse (1839-1903) and Jean-Paul Laurens (1838-1921). A couple of years after returning to Scotland he married, in 1884, Eliza Grier Ferguson, daughter of an engineer, William Ferguson, and Janet Cooper. As a wedding present, Andrew Paterson gave the couple a cottage called Kilneiss, in Moniaive, Dumfriesshire, which was extensively modified and enlarged to designs by Glasgow architect Sir John James Burnet (1857-1938) and his brother Alexander Nisbet Paterson (1862-1947) in 1894.

Paterson spent over 22 years in the area painting the Nithsdale and Ayrshire hills, the Solway Firth and the local river and burns, capturing the elusive colours and light inherent in the Scottish countryside. During this period he formed friendships with a group of artists - Sir James Guthrie (1859-1930), E. A. Walton (1860-1922), W. Y. McGregor (1855-1923), E. A. Hornel (1864-1933) and others - who came to be known collectively as 'The Glasgow Boys'.

He moved to Edinburgh in 1906, and following his wife's death in 1910, took on more public responsibilities. He was elected to the Royal Scottish Society of Painters in Watercolour (RSW) in 1885, became an associate member of the Royal Scottish Academy (ARSA) in 1896, and was awarded full membership of the Royal Scottish Academy (RSA) in 1910. He was a founder of the Edinburgh Society of Eight in 1912. He became President of the Royal Scottish Society of Painters in Watercolours in 1922 and served as Librarian of the Royal Scottish Academy between 1910 and 1924, and Secretary from 1924 until a few weeks before his death in January 1932.

He is buried in Dean Cemetery just south of the huge Nasmyth monument in the north-east corner. His son James (Hamish) Constable Paterson (1890-1955) was also an artist and is buried with him.

== Work ==
Work by Paterson was included in Glasgow Art Club's Memorial Exhibition in 1935, in memory of those of its members who had died since the First World War.

A museum devoted to Paterson's life was founded by his granddaughter Anne Paterson Wallace, in the house where Paterson's cook Miss Black lived, in Moniaive. The collection was donated by the direct descendants of his family. It included the personal collection of Anne Paterson Wallace, with over one thousand photographic images by Paterson of his family, friends, and art works, together with his own records, correspondence, documents and letters from his later life in Edinburgh. The museum closed in 2003 and the archives were donated to the University of Glasgow Library in April 2003.

Work

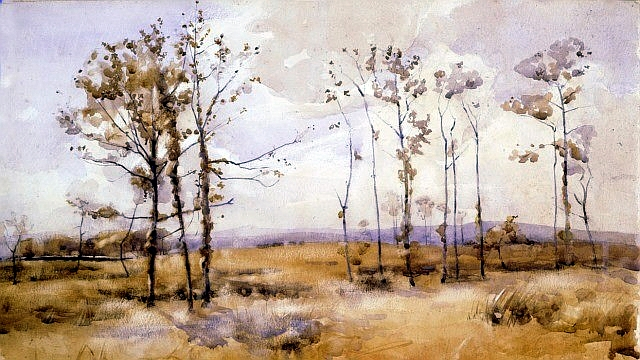
Craigenputtock (1882)

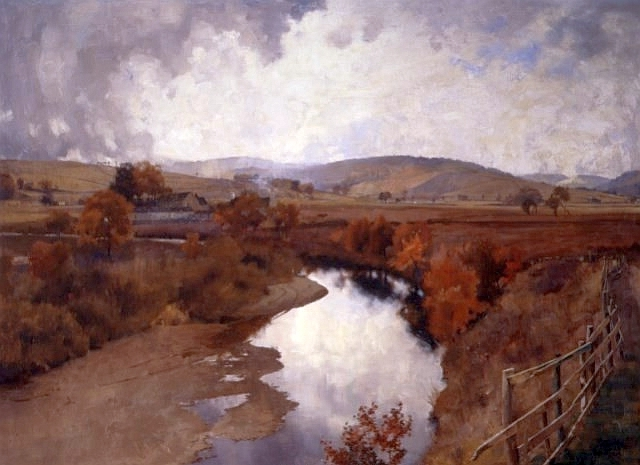
Autumn in Glencairn (1887)

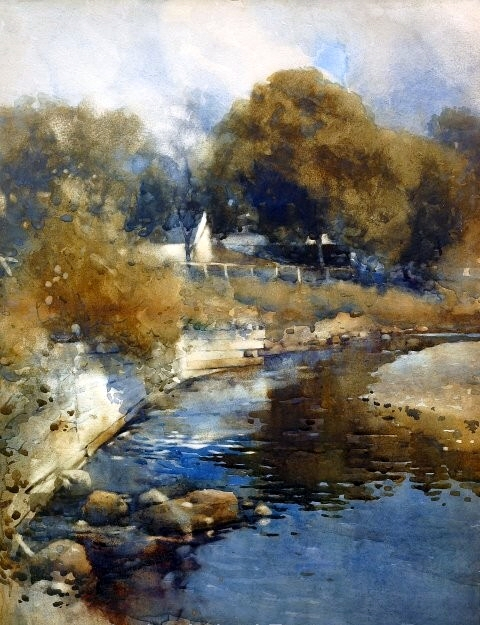
Craigdarroch Water (1889)

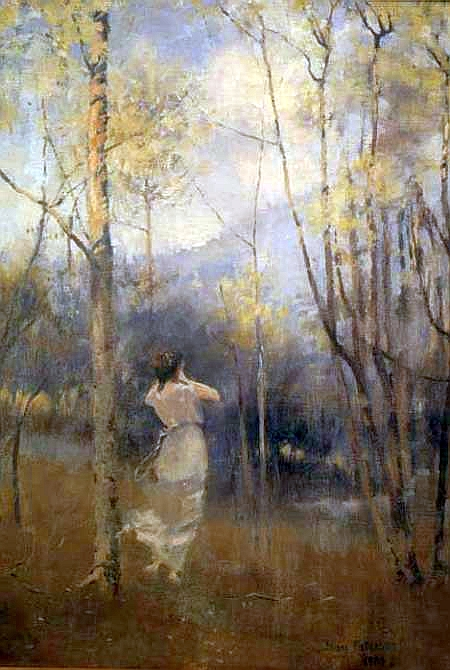
Spring In Moniaive (1889)

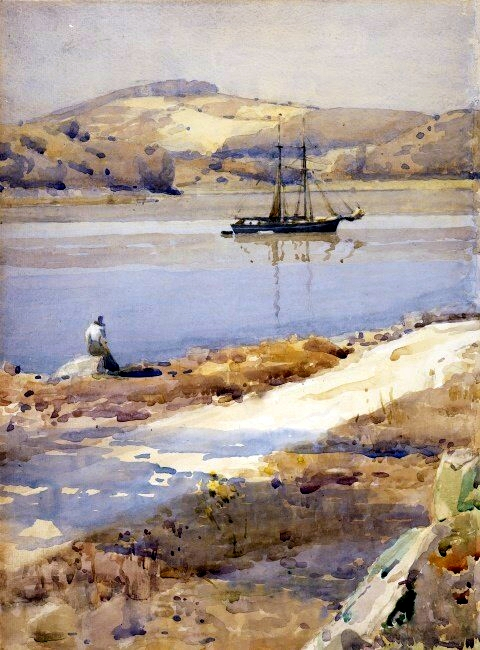
Kippford - Waiting For The Tide (1913)

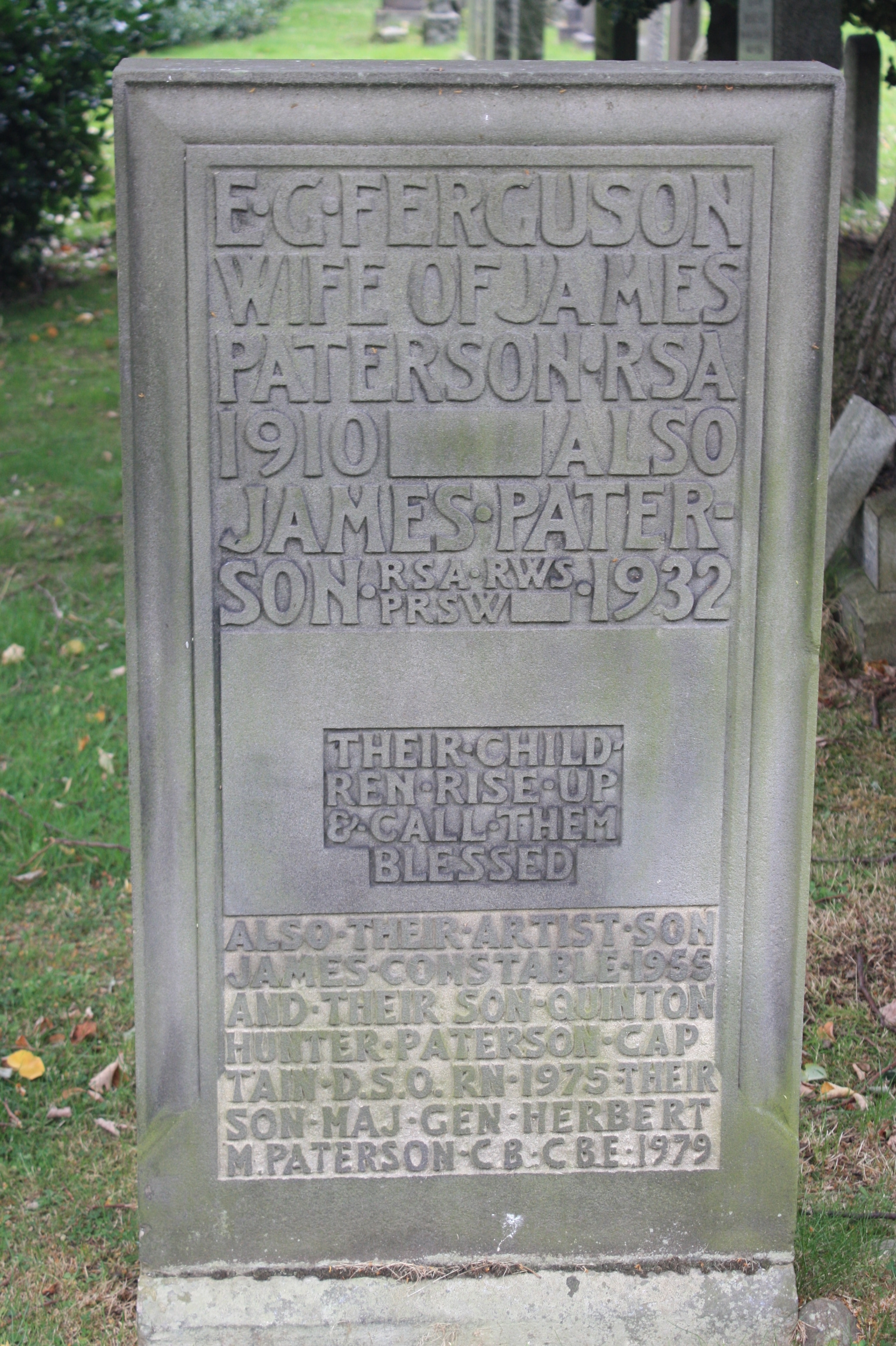
His grave, Dean Cemetery
