= Sydney Mitchell =

Scottish architect (1856–1930)

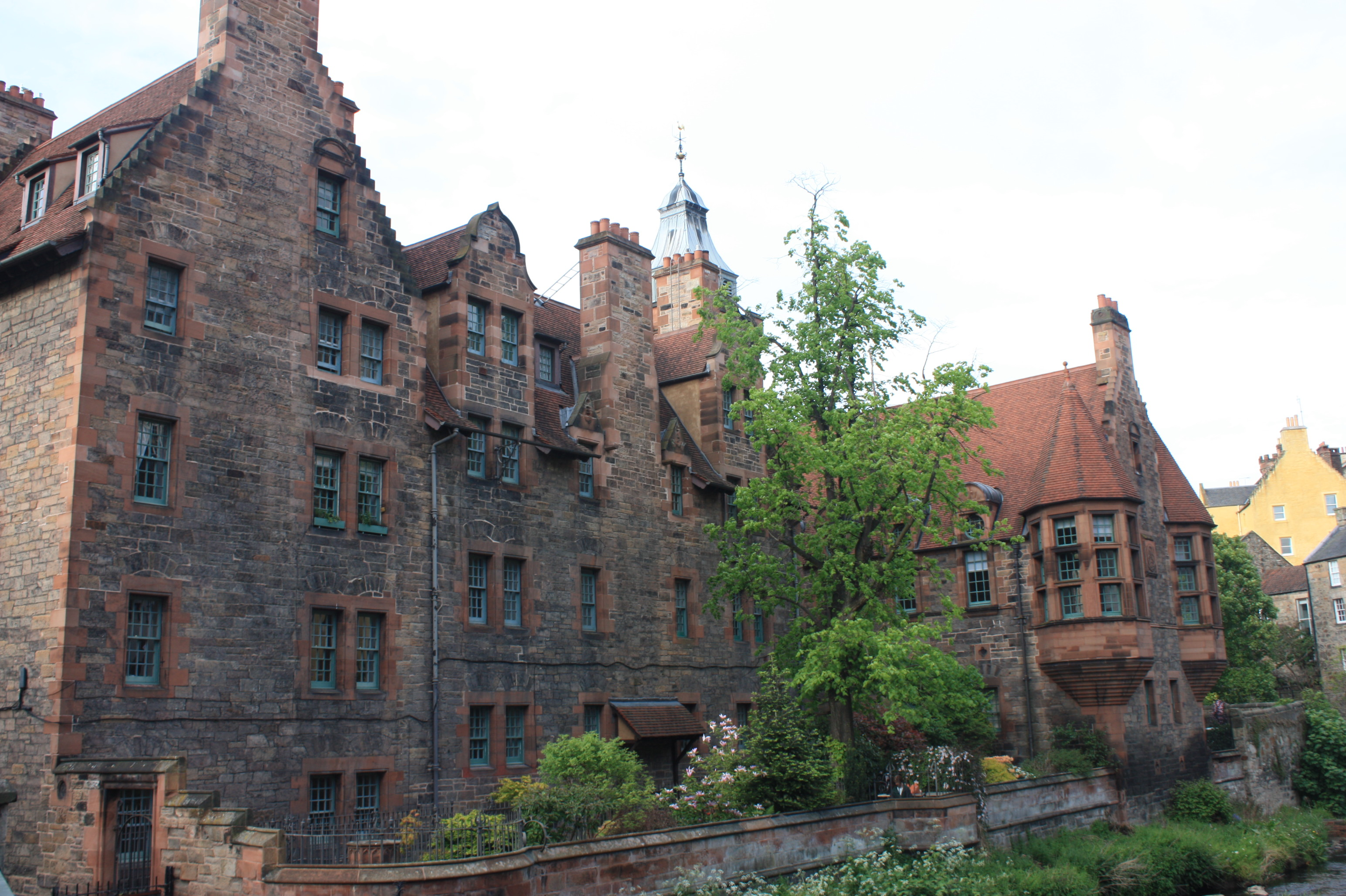
Well Court, Edinburgh

Arthur George Sydney Mitchell (7 January 1856 – 13 October 1930) was a Scottish architect. He designed a large number of bank branches, country houses, churches, and church halls. His most significant commissions include the housing developments at Well Court and Ramsay Garden, both in Edinburgh.

== Biography ==
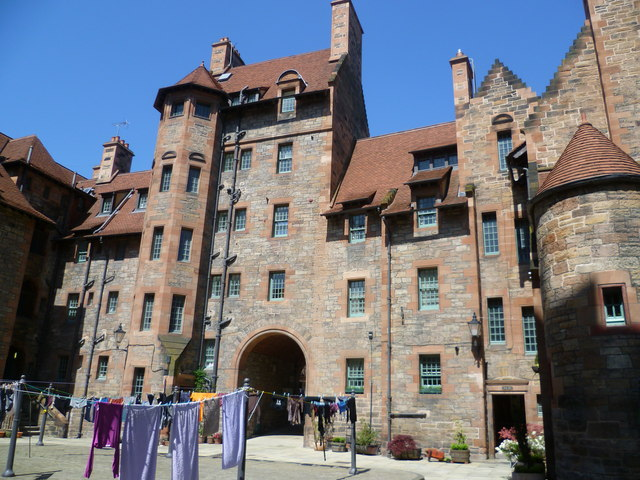
Well Court (inner courtyard)

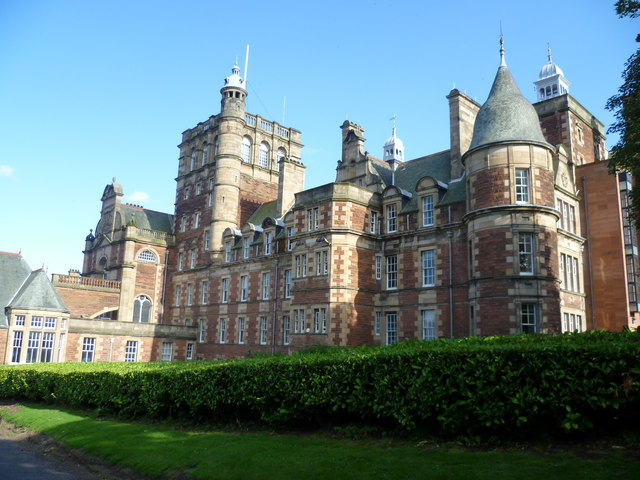
Former Craighouse Asylum, Edinburgh

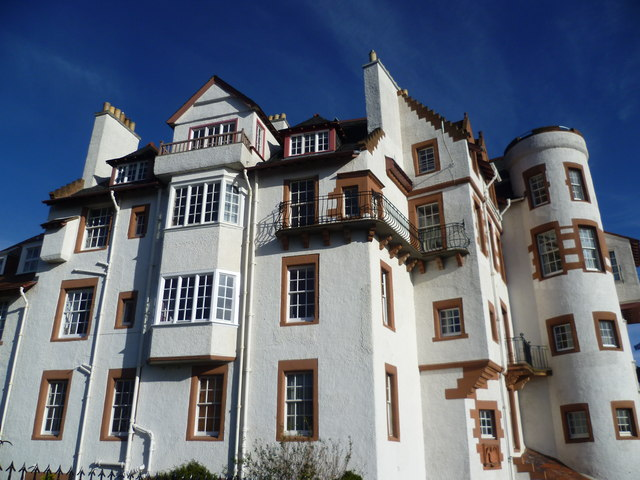
Part of Ramsay Garden, Edinburgh

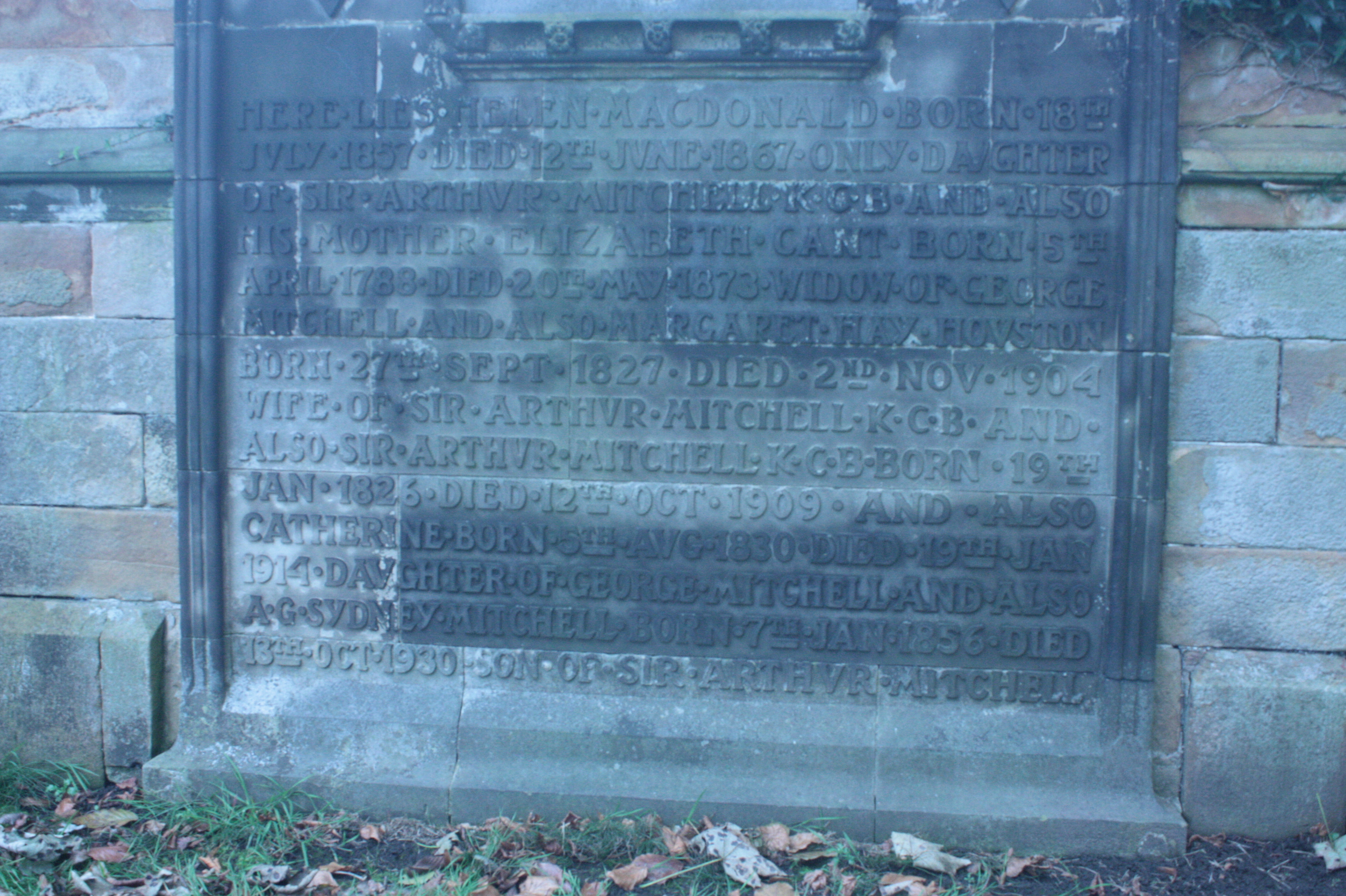
The Mitchell grave, Rosebank Cemetery, Edinburgh

Mitchell was born on 7 January 1856 in Larbert, Stirlingshire, the only son of Margaret Hay Houston and Dr Arthur Mitchell. His father was Commissioner in Lunacy for Scotland, Chairman of the Scottish Life Assurance Company, President of the Society of Antiquaries of Scotland, and was a director of the Commercial Bank of Scotland. After private tutoring, Mitchell attended the University of Edinburgh, and completed his training in the office of Robert Rowand Anderson, where he was articled from 1878 to 1883.

From being an apprentice, Mitchell went into professional practice in 1883, using family contacts to gain commissions, and having a prestigious office bought with his family's wealth at 122 George Street. George Wilson, whom he had worked with at the office of Robert Rowand Anderson, came with him as his assistant, despite being 12 years his senior. They had a lifelong relationship. Their first commission came in 1883, for the proprietor of The Scotsman newspaper, John Ritchie Findlay, whose home, 3 Rothesay Terrace, he remodelled. Another significant early commission from Findlay was for Well Court, a workers' housing development in Dean Village, Edinburgh, which he worked on between 1883 and 1886. The same year, Mitchell undertook work for the Commercial Bank, and in 1884 was appointed architect to the Bank, taking over from David Rhind who had retired in 1881. This brought him a steady stream of work, and he designed or remodelled over 20 branches over the following years.

In 1885, Mitchell was engaged to restore Edinburgh's Mercat Cross. This led to a commission to recreate several of Edinburgh's demolished medieval buildings, including the Netherbow, as part of the Edinburgh Exhibition of 1886. He continued to draw on the Scots Renaissance style, which he had employed at Well Court, in such projects as Duntreath Castle (1890).

Mitchell took his assistant, George Wilson, into partnership in 1887. Practising as Sydney Mitchell & Wilson, they were appointed by the Board of Lunacy in Scotland (due to Mitchell's fathers position as Director), with commissions for Craighouse in Edinburgh, the Crichton Royal Institution in Dumfries, Melrose Asylum, and the Royal Victoria Hospital in Edinburgh. Later works, such as Ramsay Garden close to Edinburgh Castle, incorporated more Arts & Crafts influences. His last major project was the United Free Church of Scotland Offices on George Street, Edinburgh (1908).

In 1900 his office was at 13 Young Street in Edinburgh's New Town and, despite relative success, was still living with his parents, in a Georgian building at 34 Drummond Place, slightly north of his office.

George Wilson retired in 1907, and Mitchell sold the practice to his assistant, Ernest Auldjo Jamieson, in 1909.

Mitchell retired to Gullane, East Lothian, where he died unmarried in 1930. Although originally intended to be buried in Warriston Cemetery with a monument by Ernest Auldjo Jamieson he was instead buried with his parents at Rosebank Cemetery in Edinburgh. The grave lies on the north-facing retaining wall in the centre of the cemetery.

== Family ==
He was cousin to the Scottish businessman Sir George Arthur Mitchell and designed his house at 9 Lowther Terrace in Kelvinside in Glasgow.
