= British Columbia =

Province of Canada

- Province
- Flag Coat of arms
- Motto(s): Splendor sine occasu (Latin) "Splendour without diminishment"
- Coordinates: 54°N 125°W
- Country: Canada
- Before confederation: United Colony of British Columbia
- Confederation: July 20, 1871 (7th)
- Capital: Victoria
- Largest city: Vancouver
- Largest metro: Greater Vancouver

Government
  - Type: Parliamentary constitutional monarchy
  - Lieutenant Governor: Wendy Lisogar-Cocchia
  - Premier: Lorne Doerkson
- Legislature: Legislative Assembly of British Columbia
- Federal representation: Parliament of Canada
- House seats: 43 of 343 (12.5%)
- Senate seats: 6 of 105 (5.7%)

Area
  - Total: 944,735 km^{2} (364,764 sq mi)
  - Land: 925,186 km^{2} (357,216 sq mi)
  - Water: 19,548.9 km^{2} (7,547.9 sq mi) 2.1%
  - Rank: 3rd
- 9.5% of Canada

Population (2021)
  - Total: 5,000,879
  - Estimate (Q3 2026): ▲5,710,598
  - Rank: 3rd in Canada
  - Density: 4.8/km^{2} (12/sq mi)
  - Rank: 7th
- Demonym: British Columbian (Note: According to the Oxford Guide to Canadian English Usage (ISBN 0-1954-1619-8; p. 335), BCer(s) is an informal demonym that is sometimes used for residents of BC)
- Official languages: English (de facto)

GDP
  - Rank: 4th
  - Total (2024): CA$429.089 billion
  - Per capita: CA$75,662 (7th)

HDI
  - HDI (2023): 0.937—Very high (4th)

Time zones
- Most of province: UTC−07:00 (Pacific Time (Note: Not to be confused with the Pacific Time Zone))
- East Kootenay: UTC−06:00 (Central Time)
- Canadian postal abbr.: BC
- Postal code prefix: V
- ISO 3166 code: CA-BC
- Flower: Pacific dogwood
- Tree: Western red cedar
- Bird: Steller's jay
- Website: gov.bc.ca
- Rankings include all provinces and territories

British Columbia (Note: Commonly abbreviated as BC; French: Colombie-Britannique) is the westernmost province of Canada. Situated in the Pacific Northwest between the Pacific Ocean and the Rocky Mountains, the province has a diverse geography, with rugged landscapes that include rocky coastlines, sandy beaches, forests, lakes, mountains, inland deserts, and grassy plains. British Columbia borders the province of Alberta to the east; the territories of Yukon and Northwest Territories to the north; the US states of Washington, Idaho, and Montana to the south; and Alaska to the northwest. With an estimated population of 5.68 million in 2025, it is Canada's third-most populous province. The capital of British Columbia is Victoria, while the province's largest city is Vancouver. Vancouver and its suburbs together make up the third-largest metropolitan area in Canada, with the 2021 census recording 2.6 million people in Metro Vancouver. British Columbia is Canada's third-largest province by total area, after Quebec and Ontario.

The first known human inhabitants of the area settled in British Columbia at least 10,000 years ago. They include the Coast Salish, Tsilhqotʼin, and Haida peoples, among many others. One of the earliest British settlements in the area was Fort Victoria, established in 1843, which gave rise to the city of Victoria, the capital of the Colony of Vancouver Island. The Colony of British Columbia (1858–1866) was subsequently founded by Richard Clement Moody, and by the Royal Engineers, Columbia Detachment, in response to the Fraser Canyon Gold Rush. Moody selected the site for and founded the mainland colony's capital New Westminster. The colonies of Vancouver Island and British Columbia were incorporated in 1866, after which Victoria became the united colony's capital. In 1871, British Columbia entered Confederation as the sixth province of Canada, in enactment of the British Columbia Terms of Union.

British Columbia is a diverse and cosmopolitan province, drawing on a plethora of cultural influences from its diasporas of British, European, and Asian Canadians, as well as the Indigenous population. Though the province's ethnic majority originates from the British Isles, many British Columbians also trace their ancestors to continental Europe, East Asia, and South Asia. Indigenous Canadians constitute about 6 percent of the province's total population. Christianity is the largest religion in the region, though the majority of the population is non-religious. English is the common language of the province, although Punjabi, Mandarin Chinese, and Cantonese also have a large presence in the Metro Vancouver region. The Franco-Columbian community is an officially recognized linguistic minority, and around one percent of British Columbians claim French as their mother tongue. British Columbia is home to at least 34 distinct Indigenous languages.

Major sectors of British Columbia's economy include forestry, mining, filmmaking and video production, tourism, real estate, construction, wholesale, and retail. Its main exports include lumber and timber, pulp and paper products, copper, coal, and natural gas. British Columbia exhibits high property values and is a significant centre for maritime trade: the Port of Vancouver is the largest port in Canada and the most diversified port in North America. Although less than 5 percent of British Columbia is arable land, significant agriculture exists in the Fraser Valley and Okanagan due to the warmer climate. British Columbia is home to 45% of all publicly listed companies in Canada.

== Etymology ==
The name was chosen by Queen Victoria in 1858, when British Columbia (the mainland) was first established as a British colony. It refers to the Columbia District, the British term for the region drained by the Columbia River, which was administered by the Hudson's Bay Company as the Columbia Department before becoming a colony. Victoria added British to distinguish the British colony from the United States' territory to the south, "American Columbia" or "Southern Columbia", which became the Oregon Territory on August 8, 1848.

Ultimately, the Columbia in the name British Columbia is derived from the name of the Columbia Rediviva, an American ship which lent its name to the river and later the wider region; the Columbia in the name Columbia Rediviva in turn came from the name Columbia for the New World, a reference to Christopher Columbus.

The governments of Canada and British Columbia recognize Colombie-Britannique as the French name for the province.

== Geography ==
British Columbia's geography is epitomized by the variety and intensity of its physical relief, which has defined patterns of settlement and industry since colonization.

British Columbia is bordered to the west by the Pacific Ocean and the American state of Alaska, to the north by Yukon and the Northwest Territories, to the east by the province of Alberta, and to the south by the American states of Washington, Idaho, and Montana. The southern border of British Columbia was established by the 1846 Oregon Treaty, although its history is tied with lands as far south as California. British Columbia's land area is 944,735 square kilometres (364,764 sq mi). British Columbia's rugged coastline stretches for more than 27,000 kilometres (17,000 mi), and includes deep, mountainous fjords and about 6,000 islands, most of which are uninhabited. It is the only province in Canada that borders the Pacific Ocean. British Columbia's highest mountain is Mount Fairweather; the highest mountain entirely within the province is Mount Waddington. British Columbia is considered to be part of the Pacific Northwest and the Cascadia bioregion, along with the American states of Alaska, Idaho, (western) Montana, Oregon, Washington, and (northern) California.

British Columbia's capital city, Victoria, is located on the southeastern tip of Vancouver Island. Only a narrow strip of Vancouver Island, from Campbell River to Victoria, is significantly populated. Much of the western part of Vancouver Island and the rest of the coast is covered by temperate rainforest. The province's most populous city, Vancouver, sits at the confluence of the Fraser River and Georgia Strait in the southwest corner of the mainland, an area commonly known as the Lower Mainland. By land area, Abbotsford is the province's largest city. Vanderhoof is near the geographic centre of the province. The northern, mostly mountainous, two-thirds of the province is largely unpopulated and undeveloped, except for the area east of the Rockies, where the Peace River Country contains BC's portion of the Canadian Prairies, centred at the city of Dawson Creek.

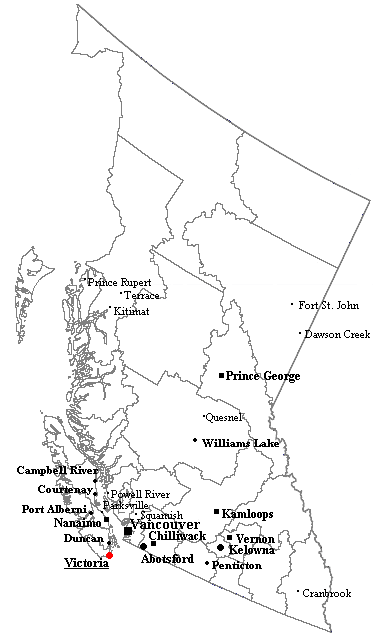
Outline map of British Columbia with significant cities and towns

The Coast Mountains and the Inside Passage's many inlets provide some of British Columbia's scenery, which forms the backdrop and context for a growing outdoor adventure and ecotourism industry. 75 percent of the province is mountainous (more than 1,000 m [3,300 ft] above sea level); 60 percent is forested; and only about 5 percent is arable.

The province's mainland away from the coastal regions is somewhat moderated by the Pacific Ocean. Terrain ranges from dry inland forests and semi-arid valleys, to the range and canyon districts of the Central and Southern Interior, to boreal forest and subarctic prairie in the Northern Interior. High mountain regions both north and south have subalpine flora and subalpine climate.

The Okanagan wine area, extending from Vernon to Osoyoos at the Oroville–Osoyoos Border Crossing, is one of several wine and cider-producing regions in Canada. Other wine regions in British Columbia include the Cowichan Valley on Vancouver Island and the Fraser Valley.

The Southern Interior cities of Kamloops and Penticton have some of the warmest and longest summer climates in Canada (while higher elevations are cold and snowy), although their temperatures are often exceeded north of the Fraser Canyon, close to the confluence of the Fraser and Thompson rivers, where the terrain is rugged and covered with desert-type flora. Semi-desert grassland is found in large areas of the Interior Plateau, with land uses ranging from ranching at lower altitudes to forestry at higher ones.

=== Climate ===
Köppen climate types in British Columbia

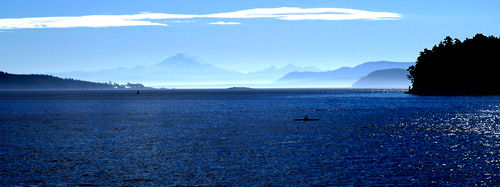
The Strait of Georgia, near Vancouver

Because of the many mountain ranges and rugged coastline, British Columbia's climate varies dramatically across the province.

Coastal southern British Columbia has a mild and rainy climate influenced by the North Pacific Current. Most of the region is classified as oceanic, though pockets of warm-summer Mediterranean climate also exist in the far-southern parts of the coast. Precipitation averages above 1,000 millimetres (39 in) in almost all of the coastal region, and Hucuktlis Lake on Vancouver Island receives an average of 6,903 mm (271.8 in) of rain annually.

Due to the blocking presence of successive mountain ranges, the climate of some of the interior valleys of the province (such as the Thompson, parts of the Fraser Canyon, the southern Cariboo and parts of the Okanagan) is semi-arid with certain locations receiving less than 250 millimetres (10 in) in annual precipitation. The annual mean temperature in the most populated areas of the province is up to 12 °C (54 °F), the mildest anywhere in Canada.

The valleys of the Southern Interior have short winters with only brief bouts of cold or infrequent heavy snow, while those in the Cariboo, in the Central Interior, are colder because of increased altitude and latitude, but without the intensity or duration experienced at similar latitudes elsewhere in Canada. Outside of the driest valleys, the Southern and Central Interior generally have a humid continental climate with widely variable precipitation. For example, the average daily low in Prince George (roughly in the middle of the province) in January is −12 °C (10 °F). Small towns in the southern interior with high elevation such as Princeton are typically colder and snowier than cities in the valleys.

Heavy snowfall occurs in all elevated mountainous terrain providing bases for skiers in both south and central British Columbia. Annual snowfall on highway mountain passes in the southern interior rivals some of the snowiest cities in Canada, and freezing rain and fog are sometimes present on such roads as well. This can result in hazardous driving conditions, as people are usually travelling between warmer areas such as Vancouver or Kamloops, and may be unaware that the conditions may be slippery and cold.

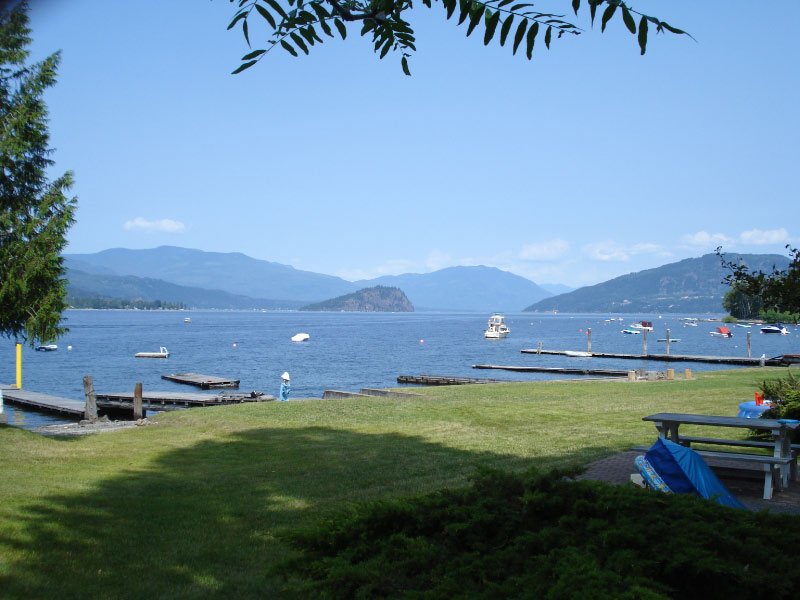
Shuswap Lake as seen from Sorrento

Winters are generally severe in the Northern Interior which is generally in the subarctic climate zone, but even there, milder air can penetrate far inland. The coldest temperature in British Columbia was recorded in Smith River, where it dropped to −58.9 °C (−74.0 °F) on January 31, 1947, one of the coldest readings recorded anywhere in North America. Atlin in the province's far northwest, along with the adjoining Southern Lakes region of Yukon, get midwinter thaws caused by the Chinook effect, which is also common (and much warmer) in more southerly parts of the Interior.

During winter on the coast, rainfall, sometimes relentless heavy rain, dominates because of consistent barrages of cyclonic low-pressure systems from the North Pacific. Average snowfall on the coast during a normal winter is between 25 and 50 centimetres (10 and 20 in), but on occasion (and not every winter) heavy snowfalls with more than 20 centimetres (8 in) and well below freezing temperatures arrive when modified arctic air reaches coastal areas, typically for short periods, and can take temperatures below −10 °C (14 °F), even at sea level. Arctic outflow winds can occasionally result in wind chill temperatures at or even below −17.8 °C (0.0 °F). While winters are very wet, coastal areas are generally milder and dry during summer under the influence of stable anti-cyclonic high pressure.

Southern Interior valleys are hot in summer; for example, in Osoyoos, the July maximum temperature averages 31.7 °C (89.1 °F), making it the hottest month of any location in Canada; this hot weather sometimes spreads towards the coast or to the far north of the province. Temperatures often exceed 40 °C (104 °F) in the lower elevations of valleys in the Interior during mid-summer, with the record high of 49.6 °C (121.3 °F) being held in Lytton on June 29, 2021, during a record-breaking heat wave that year.

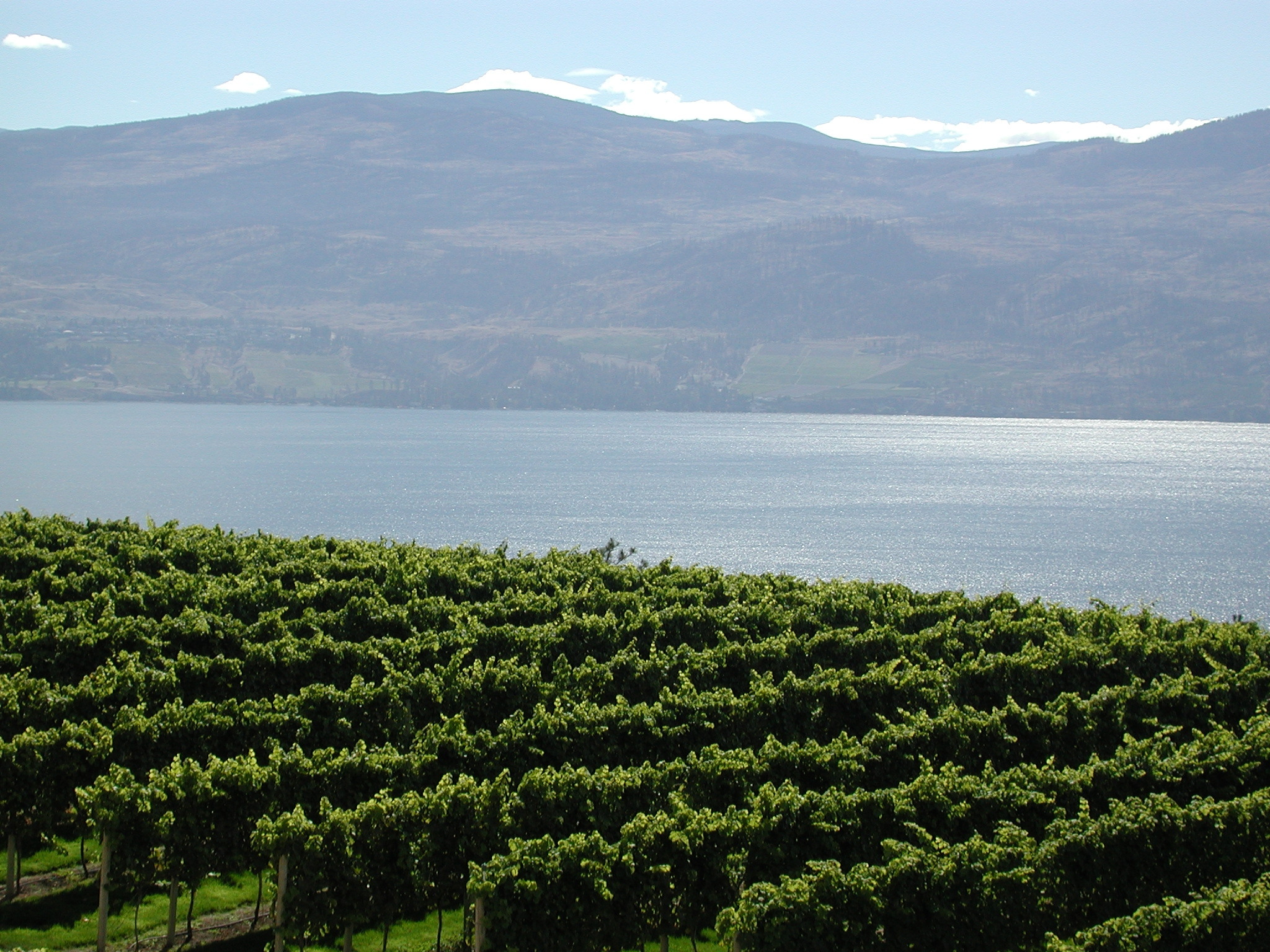
The Okanagan region has a climate suitable for vineyards.

The extended summer dryness often creates conditions that spark forest fires, from dry-lightning or man-made causes. Many areas of the province are often covered by a blanket of heavy cloud and low fog during the winter months, in contrast to abundant summer sunshine. Annual sunshine hours vary from 2200 near Cranbrook and Victoria to less than 1300 in Prince Rupert, on the North Coast just south of Southeast Alaska.

The exception to British Columbia's wet and cloudy winters is during the El Niño phase. During El Niño events, the jet stream is much farther south across North America, making the province's winters milder and drier than normal. Winters are much wetter and cooler during the opposite phase, La Niña.

Average daily maximum and minimum temperatures for selected cities in British Columbia
Municipality	January		April		July		October	
Municipality	Max	Min	Max	Min	Max	Min	Max	Min
Prince Rupert	5.6 °C (42.1 °F)	−0.8 °C (30.6 °F)	10.2 °C (50.4 °F)	2.5 °C (36.5 °F)	16.2 °C (61.2 °F)	10.5 °C (50.9 °F)	11.1 °C (52.0 °F)	4.9 °C (40.8 °F)
Tofino	8.3 °C (46.9 °F)	2.3 °C (36.1 °F)	11.9 °C (53.4 °F)	4.0 °C (39.2 °F)	18.9 °C (66.0 °F)	10.5 °C (50.9 °F)	13.6 °C (56.5 °F)	6.3 °C (43.3 °F)
Nanaimo	6.9 °C (44.4 °F)	0.1 °C (32.2 °F)	14.1 °C (57.4 °F)	3.9 °C (39.0 °F)	23.9 °C (75.0 °F)	12.3 °C (54.1 °F)	14.6 °C (58.3 °F)	5.2 °C (41.4 °F)
Victoria	7.6 °C (45.7 °F)	1.5 °C (34.7 °F)	13.6 °C (56.5 °F)	4.3 °C (39.7 °F)	22.4 °C (72.3 °F)	11.3 °C (52.3 °F)	14.2 °C (57.6 °F)	5.7 °C (42.3 °F)
Vancouver	6.9 °C (44.4 °F)	1.4 °C (34.5 °F)	13.2 °C (55.8 °F)	5.6 °C (42.1 °F)	22.2 °C (72.0 °F)	13.7 °C (56.7 °F)	13.5 °C (56.3 °F)	7.0 °C (44.6 °F)
Chilliwack	6.1 °C (43.0 °F)	0.4 °C (32.7 °F)	15.8 °C (60.4 °F)	5.2 °C (41.4 °F)	25.0 °C (77.0 °F)	12.5 °C (54.5 °F)	15.3 °C (59.5 °F)	6.4 °C (43.5 °F)
Penticton	1.8 °C (35.2 °F)	−3.0 °C (26.6 °F)	15.7 °C (60.3 °F)	2.5 °C (36.5 °F)	28.7 °C (83.7 °F)	13.3 °C (55.9 °F)	14.3 °C (57.7 °F)	3.2 °C (37.8 °F)
Kamloops	0.4 °C (32.7 °F)	−5.9 °C (21.4 °F)	16.6 °C (61.9 °F)	3.2 °C (37.8 °F)	28.9 °C (84.0 °F)	14.2 °C (57.6 °F)	13.7 °C (56.7 °F)	3.3 °C (37.9 °F)
Osoyoos	2.0 °C (35.6 °F)	−3.8 °C (25.2 °F)	18.1 °C (64.6 °F)	3.6 °C (38.5 °F)	31.5 °C (88.7 °F)	14.3 °C (57.7 °F)	16.4 °C (61.5 °F)	3.5 °C (38.3 °F)
Princeton	−1.4 °C (29.5 °F)	−8.6 °C (16.5 °F)	14.4 °C (57.9 °F)	−0.3 °C (31.5 °F)	26.3 °C (79.3 °F)	9.5 °C (49.1 °F)	13.2 °C (55.8 °F)	0.3 °C (32.5 °F)
Cranbrook	−1.9 °C (28.6 °F)	−10.2 °C (13.6 °F)	12.9 °C (55.2 °F)	0.3 °C (32.5 °F)	26.2 °C (79.2 °F)	11.2 °C (52.2 °F)	11.7 °C (53.1 °F)	−0.3 °C (31.5 °F)
Prince George	−4.0 °C (24.8 °F)	−11.7 °C (10.9 °F)	11.2 °C (52.2 °F)	−1.1 °C (30.0 °F)	22.4 °C (72.3 °F)	9.1 °C (48.4 °F)	9.4 °C (48.9 °F)	−0.5 °C (31.1 °F)
Fort Nelson	−16.1 °C (3.0 °F)	−24.6 °C (−12.3 °F)	9.6 °C (49.3 °F)	−3.6 °C (25.5 °F)	23.2 °C (73.8 °F)	10.9 °C (51.6 °F)	5.2 °C (41.4 °F)	−4.2 °C (24.4 °F)

=== Parks and protected areas ===
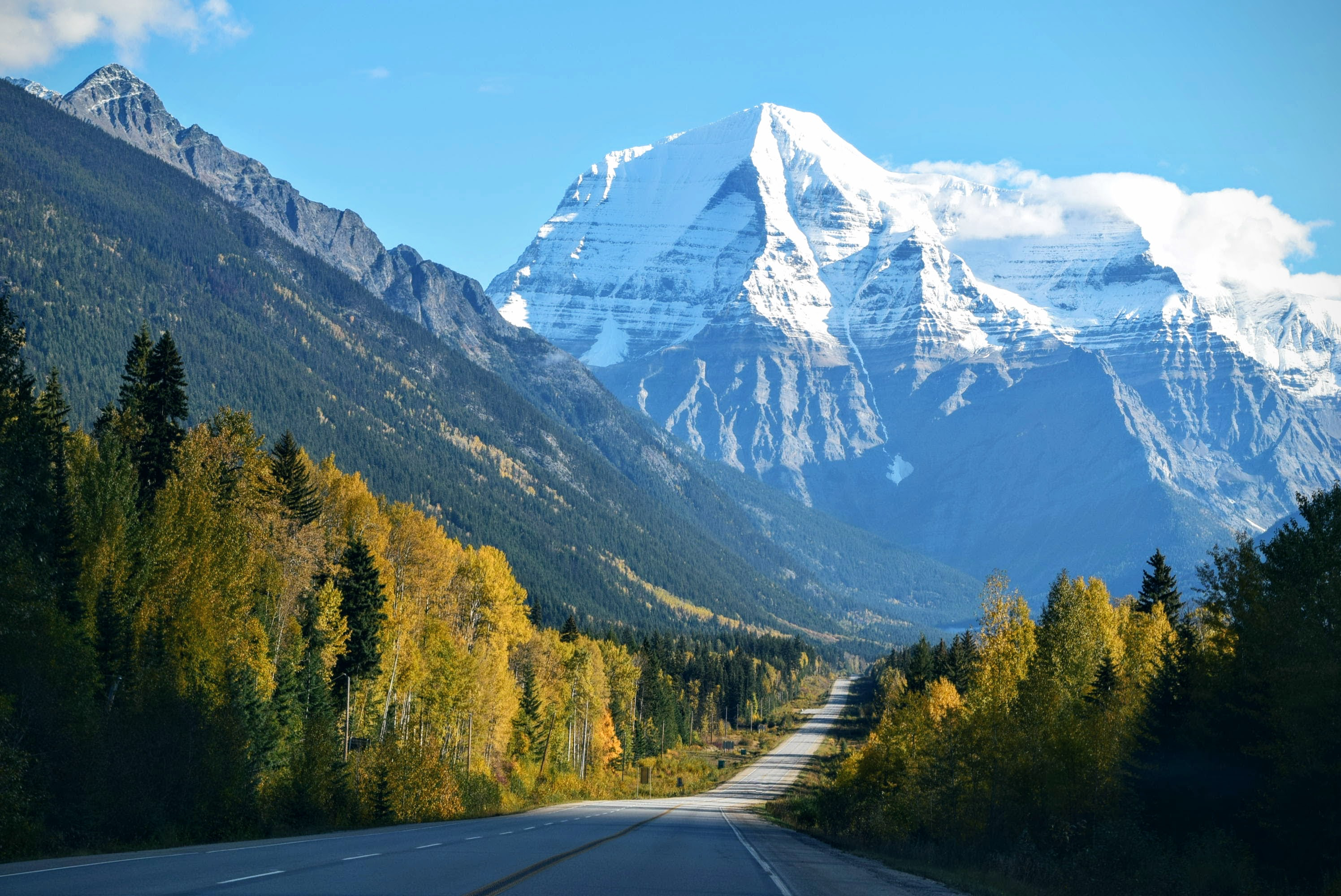
Mount Robson, Canadian Rockies

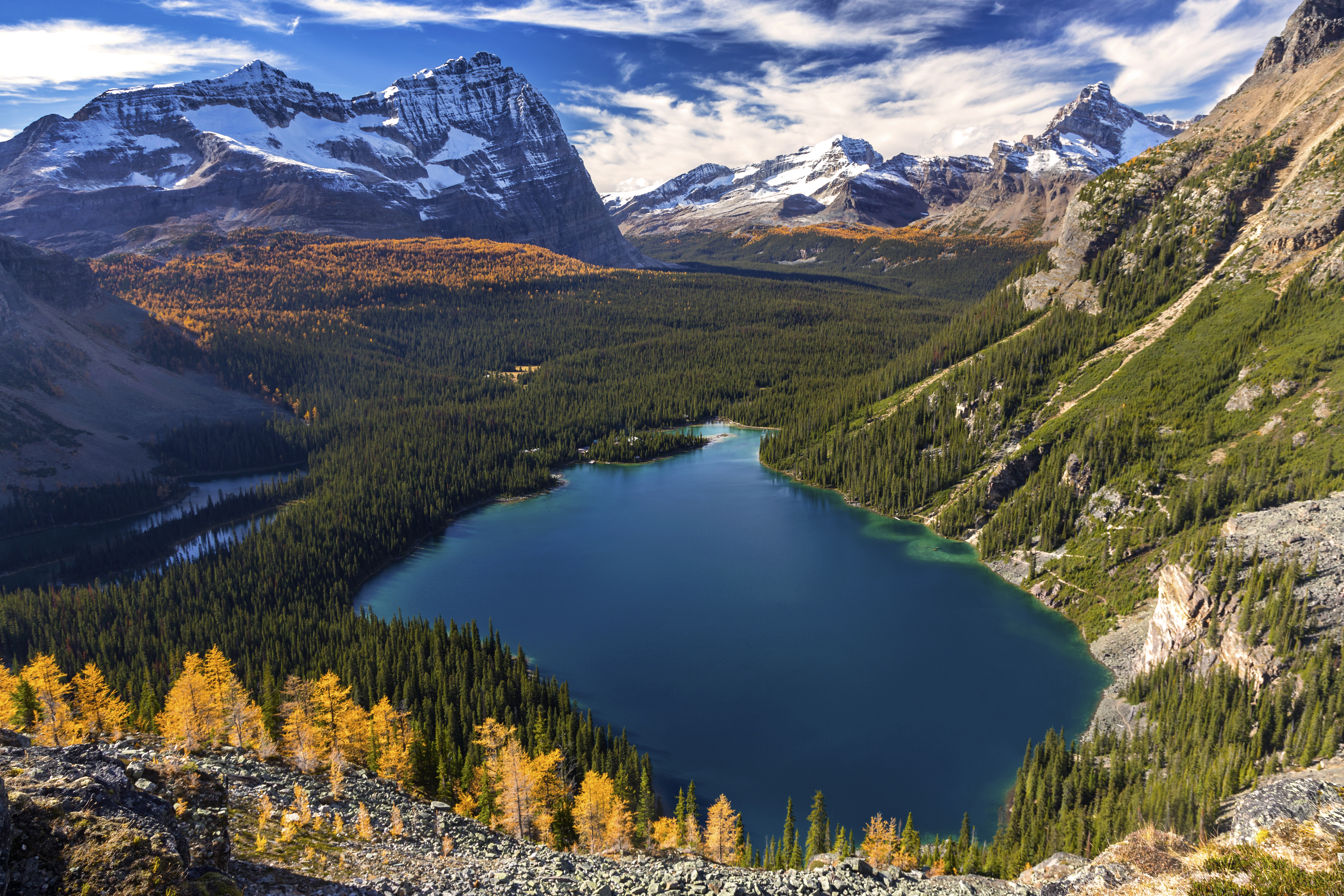
Odaray Mountain and Lake O'Hara

There are 14 designations of parks and protected areas in the province that reflect the different administration and creation of these areas in a modern context. There are 141 ecological reserves, 35 provincial marine parks, 7 provincial heritage sites, 6 National Historic Sites of Canada, 4 national parks and 3 national park reserves. 12.5 percent of the province's area (114,000 km^{2} or 44,000 sq mi) is considered protected under one of the 14 different designations that includes over 800 distinct areas.

British Columbia contains seven of Canada's national parks and National Park Reserves:

- Glacier National Park
- Gulf Islands National Park Reserve
- Gwaii Haanas National Park Reserve and Haida Heritage Site
- Kootenay National Park
- Mount Revelstoke National Park
- Pacific Rim National Park Reserve
- Yoho National Park

British Columbia contains a large number of provincial parks, run by BC Parks under the aegis of the Ministry of Environment. British Columbia's provincial parks system is the second largest parks system in Canada, the largest being Canada's National Parks system.

Another tier of parks in British Columbia are regional parks, which are maintained and run by the province's regional districts. The Ministry of Forests operates forest recreation sites.

In addition to these areas, over 47,000 square kilometres (18,000 sq mi) of arable land are protected by the Agricultural Land Reserve.

=== Fauna ===
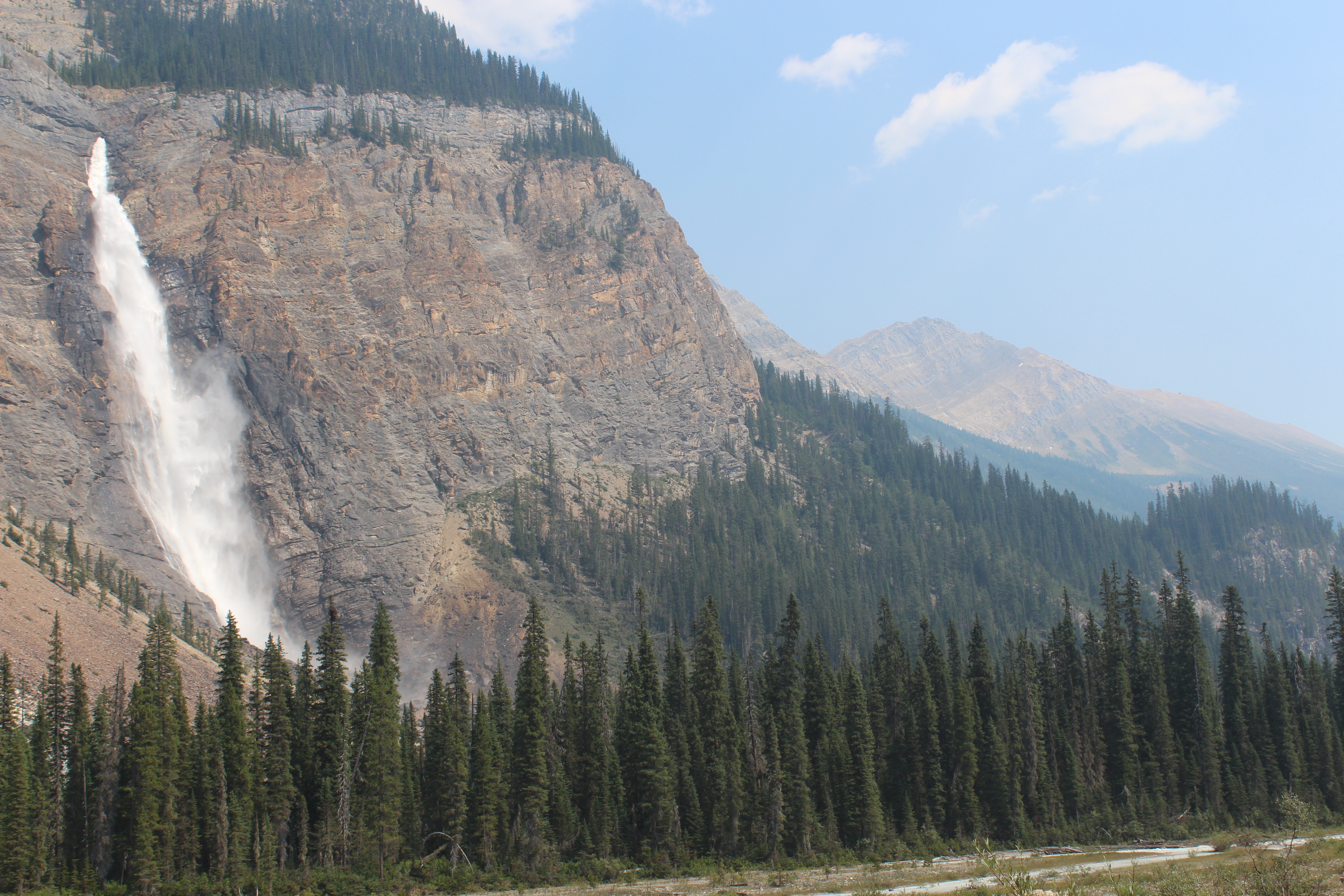
Yoho National Park

Much of the province is undeveloped, so populations of many mammalian species that have become rare in much of the United States still flourish in British Columbia. Watching animals of various sorts, including a very wide range of birds, has long been popular. Bears (grizzly, black—including the Kermode bear or spirit bear) live here, as do deer, elk, moose, caribou, big-horn sheep, mountain goats, marmots, beavers, muskrats, coyotes, wolves, mustelids (such as wolverines, badgers and fishers), cougars, eagles, ospreys, herons, Canada geese, swans, loons, hawks, owls, ravens, harlequin ducks, and many other sorts of ducks. Smaller birds (robins, jays, grosbeaks, chickadees, and so on) also abound. Murrelets are known from Frederick Island, a small island off the coast of Haida Gwaii.

British Columbia is home to approximately 35,000 species of insects, including butterflies, moths and bees.

Many healthy populations of fish are present, including salmonids such as several species of salmon, trout, steelhead, and char. Besides salmon and trout, sport-fishers in BC also catch halibut, bass, and sturgeon. On the coast, harbour seals and river otters are common. Cetacean species native to the coast include the orca, humpback whale, grey whale, harbour porpoise, Dall's porpoise, Pacific white-sided dolphin and minke whale.

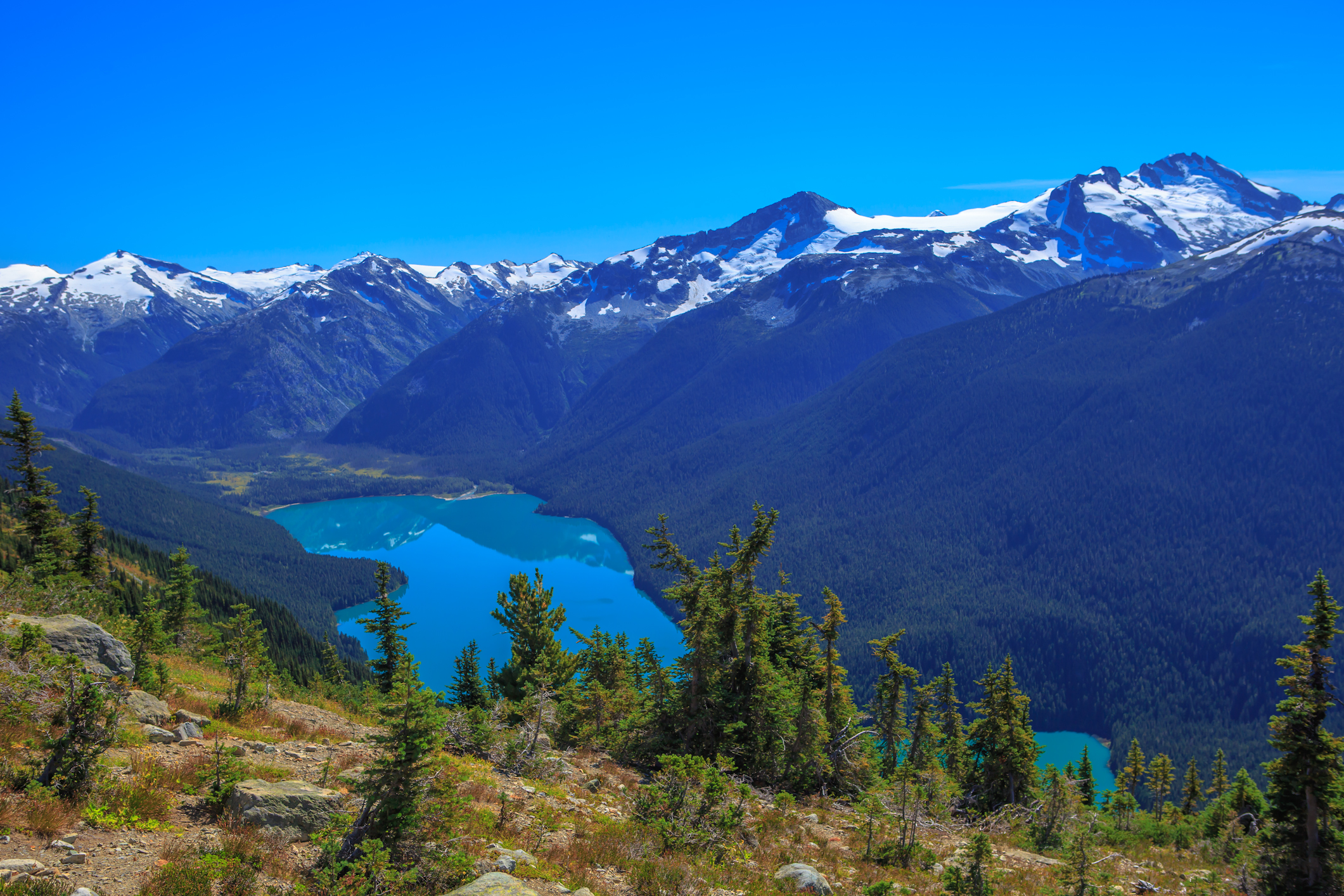
Cheakamus Lake in Garibaldi Provincial Park

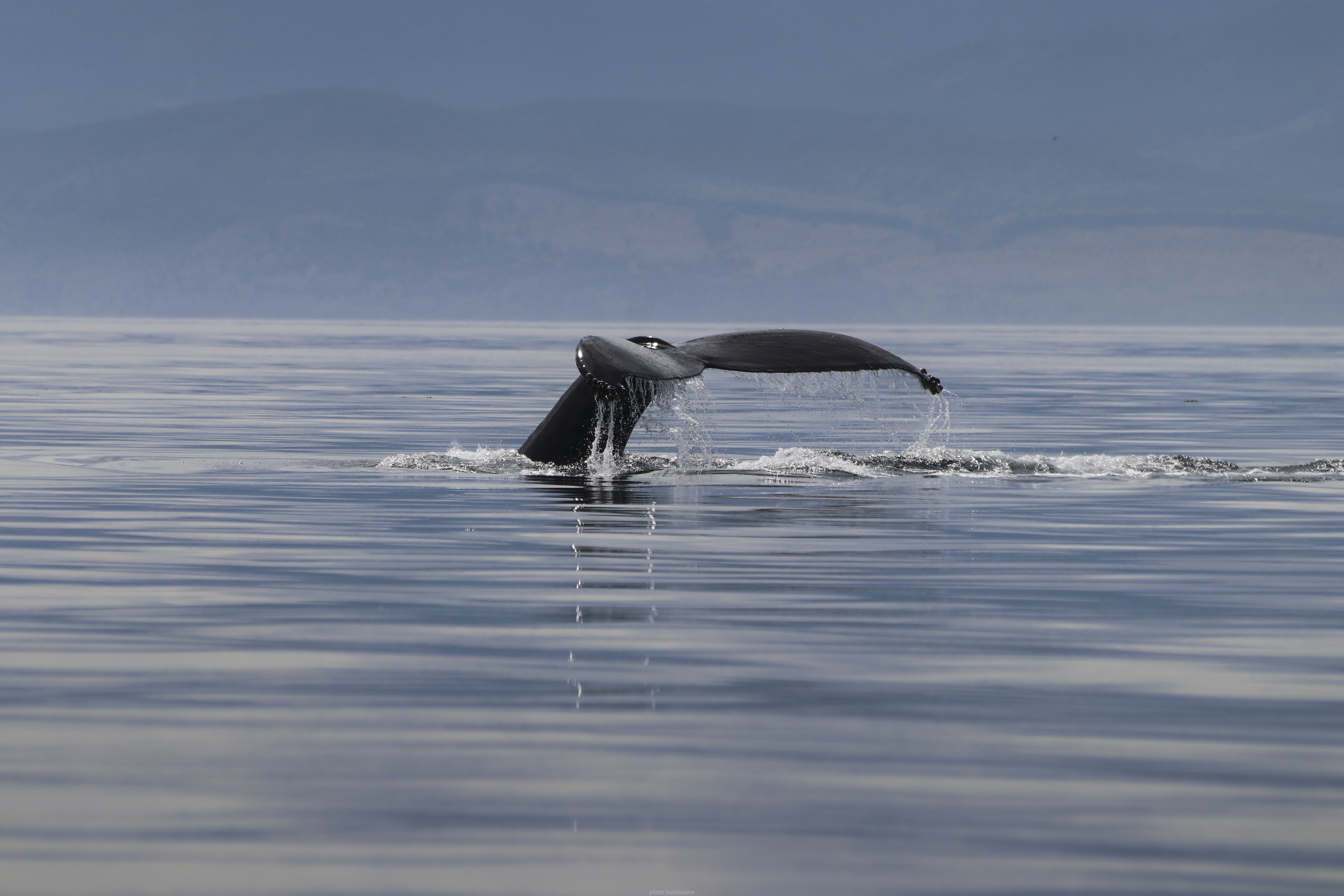
Humpback whale in Sooke coast

Some endangered species in British Columbia are: Vancouver Island marmot, spotted owl, American white pelican, and badgers.

Endangered species in British Columbia
Type of organism	Red-listed species in BC	Total number of species in BC
Freshwater fish	24	80
Amphibians	5	19
Reptiles	6	16
Birds	34	465
Terrestrial mammals	(Requires new data)	(Requires new data)
Marine mammals	3	29
Plants	257	2333
Butterflies	19	187
Dragonflies	9	87

=== Forests ===
White spruce or Engelmann spruce and their hybrids occur in 12 of the 14 biogeoclimatic zones of British Columbia. Common types of trees present in BC's forests include western redcedar, yellow-cedar, Rocky Mountain juniper, lodgepole pine, ponderosa or yellow pine, whitebark pine, limber pine, western white pine, western larch, tamarack, alpine larch, white spruce, Engelmann spruce, Sitka spruce, black spruce, grand fir, Amabilis fir, subalpine fir, western hemlock, mountain hemlock, Douglas-fir, western yew, Pacific dogwood, bigleaf maple, Douglas maple, vine maple, arbutus, black hawthorn, cascara, Garry oak, Pacific crab apple, choke cherry, pin cherry, bitter cherry, red alder, mountain alder, paper birch, water birch, black cottonwood, balsam poplar, trembling aspen.

=== Traditional plant foods ===
First Nations peoples of British Columbia used plants for food, and to produce material goods like fuel and building products. Plant foods included berries, and roots like camas.

=== Ecozones ===
Environment Canada subdivides British Columbia into six ecozones:

- Pacific Marine
- Pacific Maritime
- Boreal Cordillera
- Montane Cordillera
- Taiga Plains
- Boreal Plains Ecozones.

== History ==
=== Indigenous societies ===
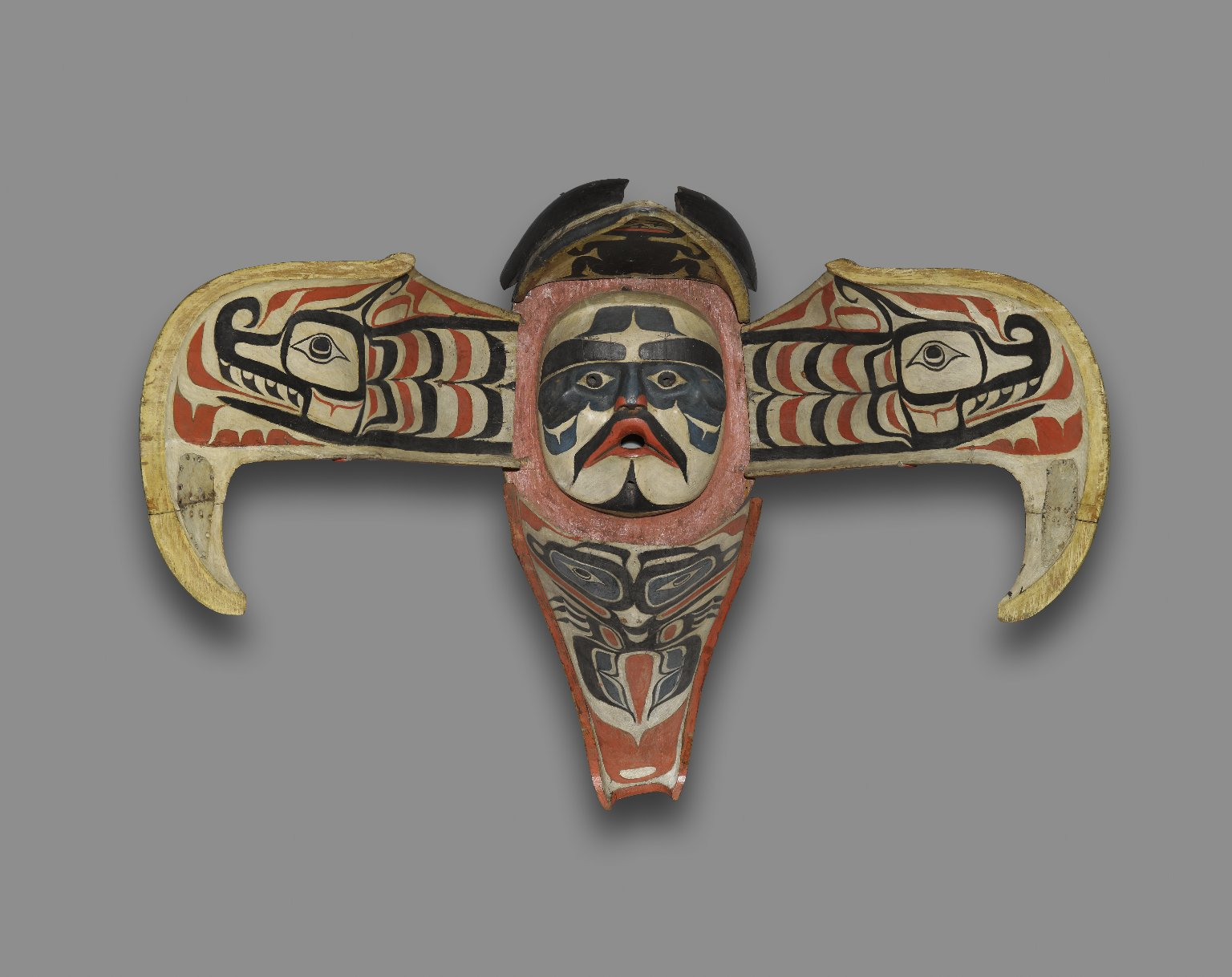
ʼNamgis Thunderbird Transformation Mask, 19th century

The area now known as British Columbia is home to First Nations groups with several indigenous languages. There are more than 200 First Nations in BC. Prior to contact (with non-Aboriginal people), human history is known from oral histories, archaeological investigations, and from early records from explorers encountering societies early in the period.

The arrival of Paleoindians from Beringia took place between 20,000 and 12,000 years ago. Hunter-gatherer families were the main social structure from 10,000 to 5,000 years ago. The nomadic population lived in non-permanent structures foraging for nuts, berries and edible roots while hunting and trapping larger and small game for food and furs. Around 5,000 years ago individual groups started to focus on resources available to them locally. Coast Salish peoples had complex land management practices linked to ecosystem health and resilience. Forest gardens on Canada's northwest coast included crabapple, hazelnut, cranberry, wild plum, and wild cherry species. Thus with the passage of time there is a pattern of increasing regional generalization with a more sedentary lifestyle. These indigenous populations evolved over the next 5,000 years across a large area into many groups with shared traditions and customs.

To the northwest of the province are the peoples of the Na-Dene languages, which include the Athapaskan-speaking peoples and the Tlingit, who live on the islands of southern Alaska and northern British Columbia. The Na-Dene language group is believed to be linked to the Yeniseian languages of Siberia: the Dene of the western Arctic may represent a distinct wave of migration from Asia to North America. The Interior of British Columbia is home to the Salishan language groups such as the Shuswap (Secwepemc), Okanagan and Athabaskan language groups, primarily the Dakelh (Carrier) and the Tsilhqotʼin.

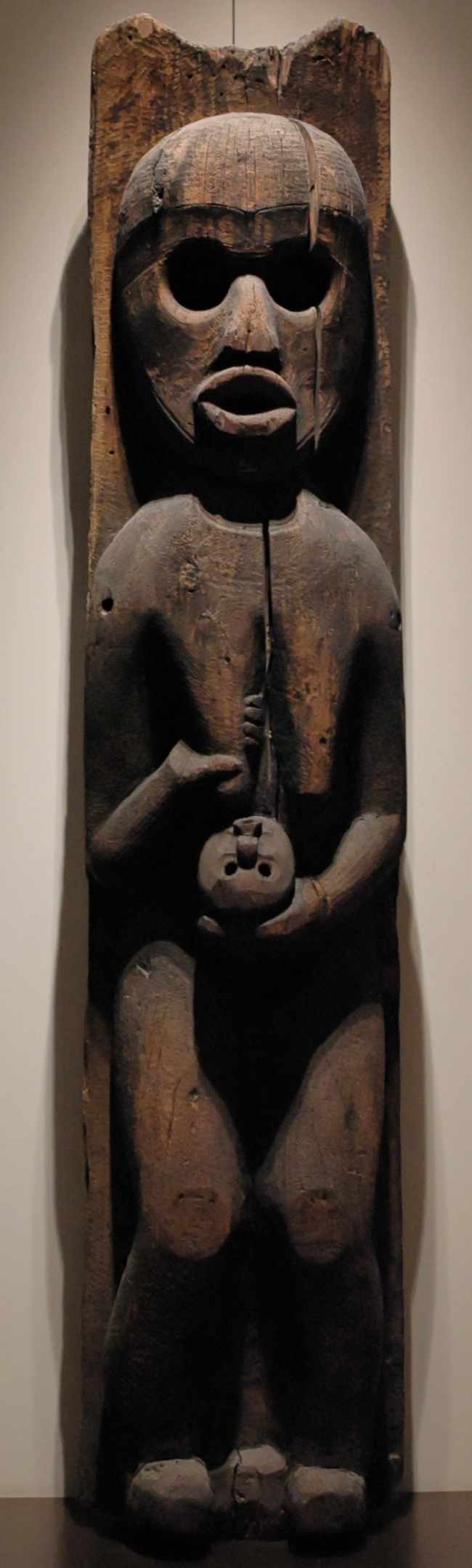
Kwakwaka'wakw house pole depicting a woman holding an infant, second half of the 19th century

The inlets and valleys of the British Columbia coast shelter large, distinctive populations, such as the Haida, Kwakwakaʼwakw and Nuu-chah-nulth, sustained by the region's abundant salmon and shellfish. These peoples developed complex cultures dependent on the western red cedar that included wooden houses, seagoing whaling and war canoes and elaborately carved potlatch items and totem poles.

Contact with Europeans brought a series of devastating epidemics of diseases the people had no immunity to. The population dramatically collapsed, culminating in the 1862 smallpox outbreak in Victoria that spread throughout the coast. European settlement did not bode well for the remaining native population of British Columbia. Colonial officials deemed colonists could make better use of the land than the First Nations people, and thus the land should be owned by the colonists. To ensure colonists would be able to settle properly and make use of the land, First Nations were forcibly relocated onto reserves, which were often too small to support their way of life. By the 1930s, British Columbia had over 1,500 reserves.

=== Fur trade and colonial era ===
Lands now known as British Columbia were added to the British Empire during the 19th century. Colonies originally begun with the support of the Hudson's Bay Company (Vancouver Island, the mainland) were amalgamated, then entered Confederation as British Columbia in 1871 as part of the Dominion of Canada.

During the 1770s, smallpox killed at least 30 percent of the Pacific Northwest First Nations. This devastating epidemic was the first in a series; the 1862 Pacific Northwest smallpox epidemic killed about half to two-thirds of the native population of what became British Columbia.

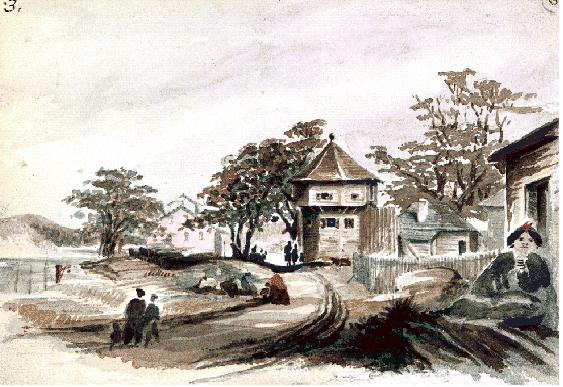
Fort Victoria in 1845

The arrival of Europeans began around the mid-18th century, as fur traders entered the area to harvest sea otters. While it is thought Francis Drake may have explored the British Columbian coast in 1579, it was Juan Pérez who completed the first documented voyage, which took place in 1774. Juan Francisco de la Bodega y Quadra explored the coast in 1775. In doing so, Pérez and Quadra reasserted the Spanish claim for the Pacific coast, first made by Vasco Núñez de Balboa in 1513.

The explorations of James Cook in 1778 and George Vancouver in 1792 and 1793 established British jurisdiction over the coastal area north and west of the Columbia River. In 1793, Alexander Mackenzie was the first European to journey across North America overland to the Pacific Ocean, inscribing a stone marking his accomplishment on the shoreline of Dean Channel near Bella Coola. His expedition theoretically established British sovereignty inland, and a succession of other fur company explorers charted the maze of rivers and mountain ranges between the Canadian Prairies and the Pacific. Mackenzie and other explorers—notably John Finlay, Simon Fraser, Samuel Black, and David Thompson—were primarily concerned with extending the fur trade, rather than political considerations. In 1794, by the third of a series of agreements known as the Nootka Conventions, Spain conceded its claims of exclusivity in the Pacific. This opened the way for formal claims and colonization by other powers, including Britain, but because of the Napoleonic Wars, there was little British action on its claims in the region until later.

The establishment of trading posts by the North West Company and the Hudson's Bay Company (HBC), effectively established a permanent British presence in the region. The Columbia District was broadly defined as being south of 54°40′ north latitude, (the southern limit of Russian America), north of Mexican-controlled California, and west of the Rocky Mountains. It was, by the Anglo-American Convention of 1818, under the "joint occupancy and use" of citizens of the United States and subjects of Britain. This co-occupancy was ended with the Oregon Treaty of 1846.

The major supply route was the York Factory Express between Hudson Bay and Fort Vancouver. Some of the early outposts grew into settlements, communities and cities. Among the places in British Columbia that began as fur trading posts are Fort St. John (established 1794); Hudson's Hope (1805); Fort Nelson (1805); Fort St. James (1806); Prince George (1807); Kamloops (1812); Fort Langley (1827); Fort Victoria (1843); Yale (1848); and Nanaimo (1853). Fur company posts that became cities in what is now the United States include Vancouver, Washington (Fort Vancouver), formerly the "capital" of Hudson's Bay operations in the Columbia District, Colville and Walla Walla (old Fort Nez Percés).

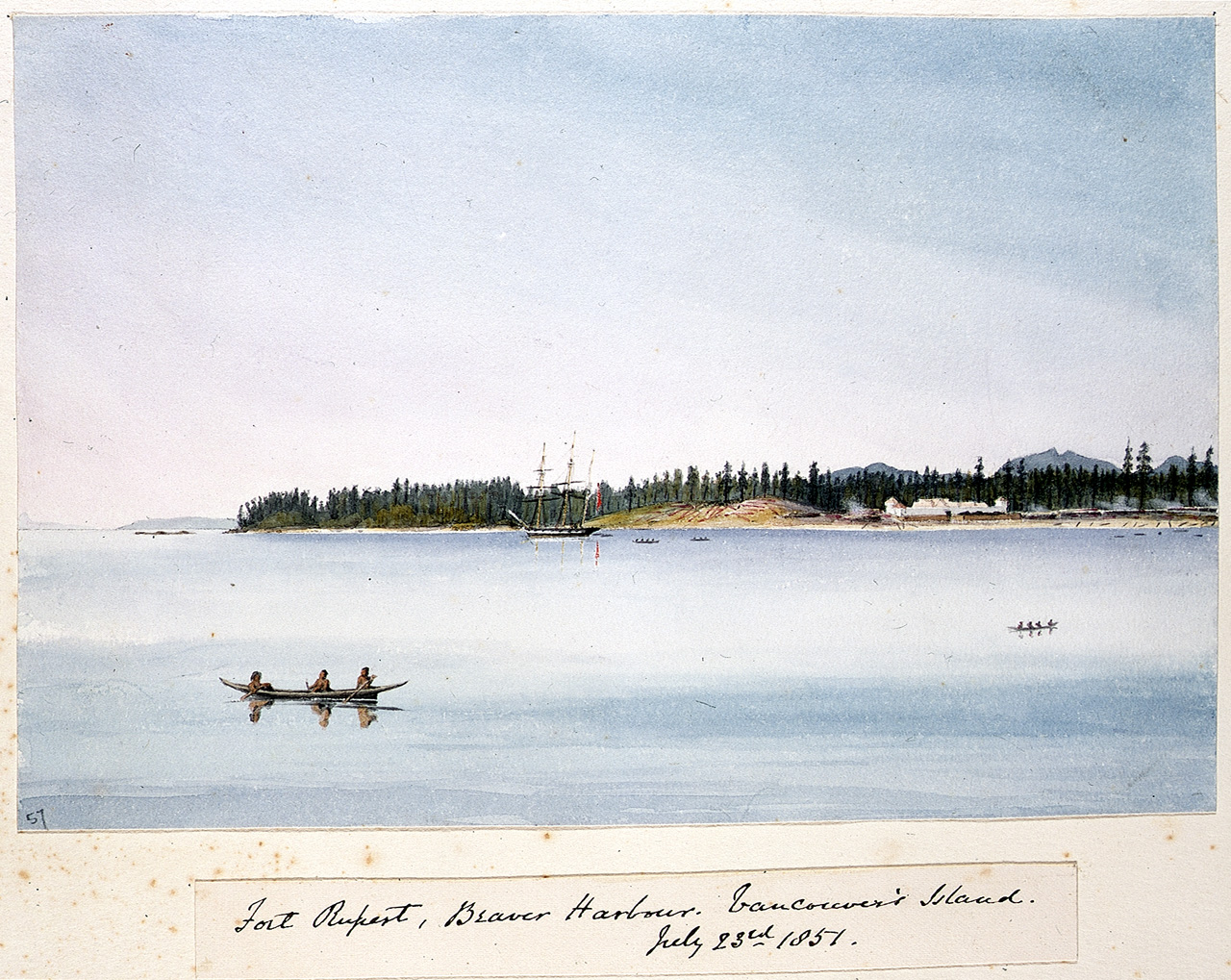
Fort Rupert, Vancouver Island, 1851

With the amalgamation of the two fur trading companies in 1821, modern-day British Columbia existed in three fur-trading departments. The bulk of the central and northern interior was organized into the New Caledonia district, administered from Fort St. James. The interior south of the Thompson River watershed and north of the Columbia was organized into the Columbia District, administered from Fort Vancouver on the lower Columbia River. The northeast corner of the province east of the Rockies, known as the Peace River Block, was attached to the much larger Athabasca District, headquartered in Fort Chipewyan, in present-day Alberta.

Until 1849, these Pacific Slope districts were unorganized territory within British North America. While operating under the de facto jurisdiction of HBC administrators, the region—unlike Rupert's Land to the north and east—was never a corporate concession. Instead, the company merely held a monopoly to trade with the First Nations inhabitants. This status quo was disrupted by the westward expansion of American exploration and overlapping claims of territorial sovereignty, particularly in the southern Columbia Basin across present-day Washington and Oregon. In 1846, the Oregon Treaty divided the territory along the 49th parallel to the Strait of Georgia, with the area south of this boundary (excluding Vancouver Island and the Gulf Islands) transferred to sole American sovereignty. The Colony of Vancouver Island was created in 1849, with Victoria designated as the capital. New Caledonia, as the whole of the mainland rather than just its north-central Interior came to be called, continued to be an unorganized territory of British North America, "administered" by individual HBC trading post managers.

=== Colony of British Columbia (1858–1866) ===
With the Fraser Canyon Gold Rush in 1858, an influx of Americans into New Caledonia prompted the colonial office to designate the mainland as the Colony of British Columbia. When news of the Fraser Canyon Gold Rush reached London, Richard Clement Moody was hand-picked by the Colonial Office, under Edward Bulwer-Lytton, to establish British order and to transform the newly established Colony of British Columbia into the British Empire's "bulwark in the farthest west" and "found a second England on the shores of the Pacific". Lytton desired to send to the colony "representatives of the best of British culture, not just a police force": he sought men who possessed "courtesy, high breeding and urbane knowledge of the world" and he decided to send Moody, whom the government considered to be the archetypal "English gentleman and British Officer" to lead the Royal Engineers, Columbia Detachment.

Moody and his family arrived in British Columbia in December 1858. He was sworn in as the first lieutenant governor of British Columbia and appointed Chief Commissioner of Lands and Works for British Columbia. On the advice of Lytton, Moody hired Robert Burnaby as his personal secretary.

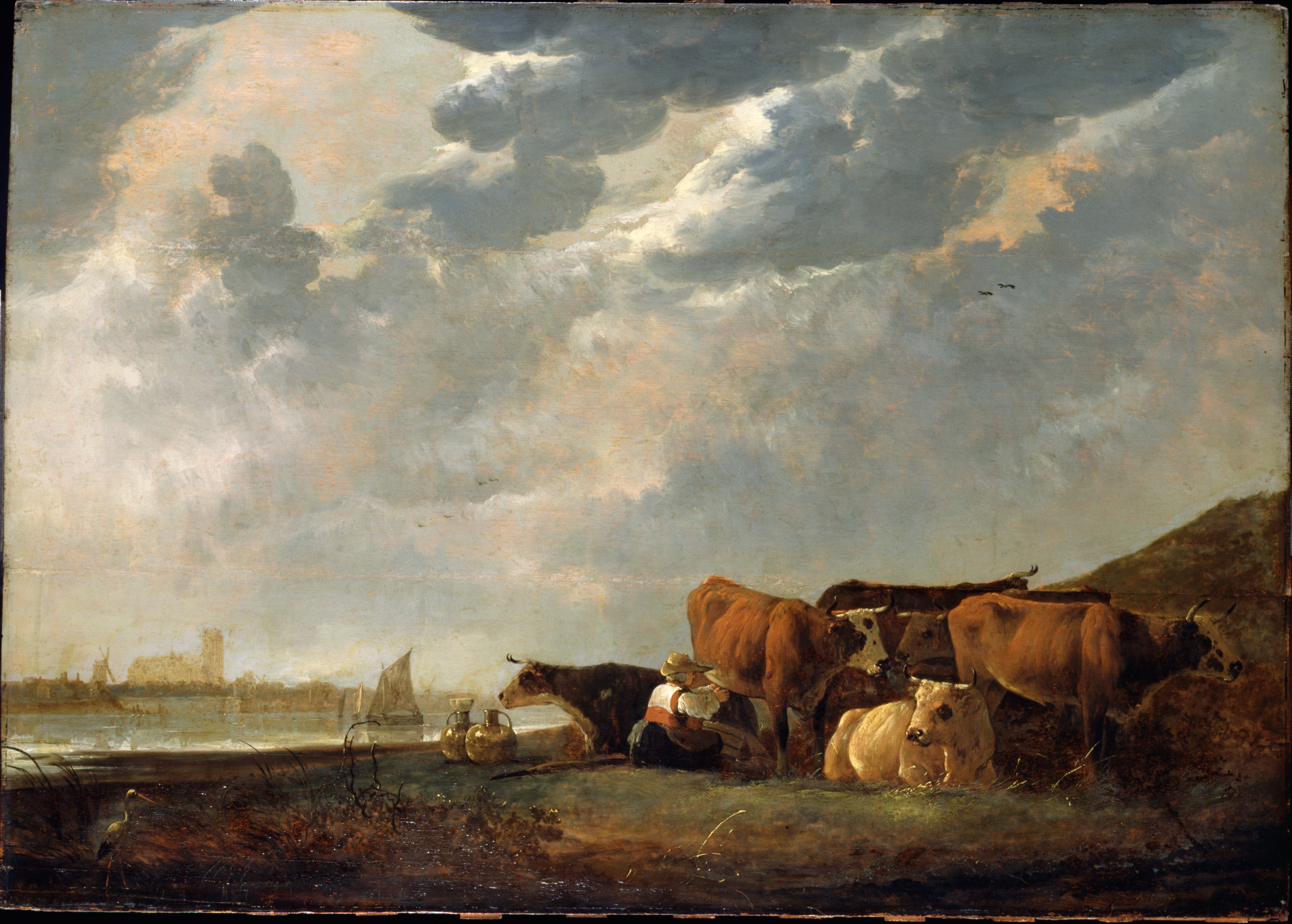
Cattle near the Maas by Dutch painter Aelbert Cuyp. Moody likened his vision of the nascent Colony of British Columbia to the pastoral scenes painted by Cuyp.

In British Columbia, Moody "wanted to build a city of beauty in the wilderness" and planned his city as an iconic visual metaphor for British dominance, "styled and located with the objective of reinforcing the authority of the crown and of the robe". Subsequent to the enactment of the Pre-emption Act of 1860, Moody settled the Lower Mainland. He selected the site and founded the new capital, New Westminster. He selected the site due to the strategic excellence of its position and the quality of its port. He was also struck by the majestic beauty of the site, writing in his letter to Blackwood,

The entrance to the Frazer is very striking—Extending miles to the right & left are low marsh lands (apparently of very rich qualities) & yet fr the Background of Superb Mountains-- Swiss in outline, dark in woods, grandly towering into the clouds there is a sublimity that deeply impresses you. Everything is large and magnificent, worthy of the entrance to the Queen of England's dominions on the Pacific mainland. ... My imagination converted the silent marshes into Cuyp-like pictures of horses and cattle lazily fattening in rich meadows in a glowing sunset. ... The water of the deep clear Frazer was of a glassy stillness, not a ripple before us, except when a fish rose to the surface or broods of wild ducks fluttered away.

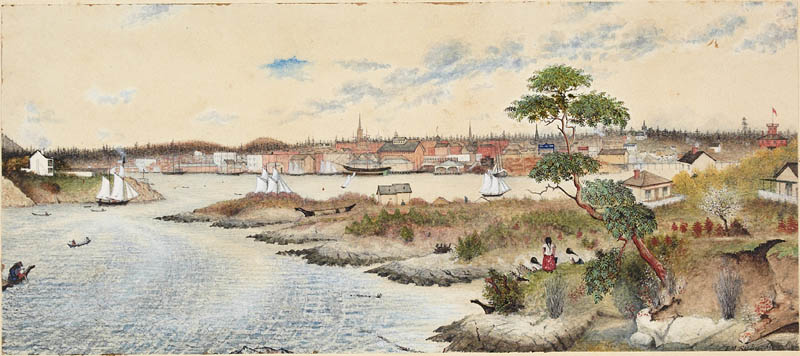
Victoria, 1864

Lord Lytton "forgot the practicalities of paying for clearing and developing the site and the town" and the efforts of Moody's engineers were continuously hampered by insufficient funds, which, together with the continuous opposition of Governor James Douglas, whom Thomas Frederick Elliot described as "like any other fraud", "made it impossible for [Moody's] design to be fulfilled".

Moody and the Royal Engineers also built an extensive road network, including what would become Kingsway, connecting New Westminster to False Creek, the North Road between Port Moody and New Westminster, and the Cariboo Road and Stanley Park. He named Burnaby Lake after his private secretary Robert Burnaby and named Port Coquitlam's 400-foot "Mary Hill" after his wife. As part of the surveying effort, several tracts were designated "government reserves", which included Stanley Park as a military reserve (a strategic location in case of an American invasion). The Pre-emption Act did not specify conditions for distributing the land, so large parcels were snapped up by speculators, including 1,518 hectares (3,750 acres) by Moody himself. For this he was criticized by local newspapermen for land grabbing. Moody designed the first coat of arms of British Columbia. Port Moody is named after him. It was established at the end of a trail that connected New Westminster with Burrard Inlet to defend New Westminster from potential attack from the US.

By 1862, the Cariboo Gold Rush, attracting an additional 5000 miners, was underway, and Douglas hastened construction of the Great North Road (commonly known now as the Cariboo Wagon Road) up the Fraser Canyon to the prospecting region around Barkerville. By the time of this gold rush, the character of the colony was changing, as a more stable population of British colonists settled in the region, establishing businesses, opening sawmills, and engaging in fishing and agriculture. With this increased stability, objections to the colony's absentee governor and the lack of responsible government began to be vocalized, led by the influential editor of the New Westminster British Columbian and future premier of British Columbia John Robson, who had wanted Richard Clement Moody's office to include that of Governor of British Columbia, to make Douglas obsolete. A series of petitions requesting an assembly were ignored by Douglas and the colonial office until Douglas was eased out of office in 1864. Finally, the colony would have both an assembly and a resident governor.

=== Later gold rushes ===
A series of gold rushes in various parts of the province followed, the largest being the Cariboo Gold Rush in 1862, forcing the colonial administration into deeper debt as it struggled to meet the extensive infrastructure needs of far-flung boom communities like Barkerville and Lillooet, which sprang up overnight. The Vancouver Island colony was facing financial crises of its own, and pressure to merge the two eventually succeeded in 1866, when the colony of British Columbia was amalgamated with the Colony of Vancouver Island to form the Colony of British Columbia (1866–1871), which was, in turn, succeeded by the present day province of British Columbia following the Canadian Confederation of 1871.

=== Rapid growth and development (1860s to 1910s) ===
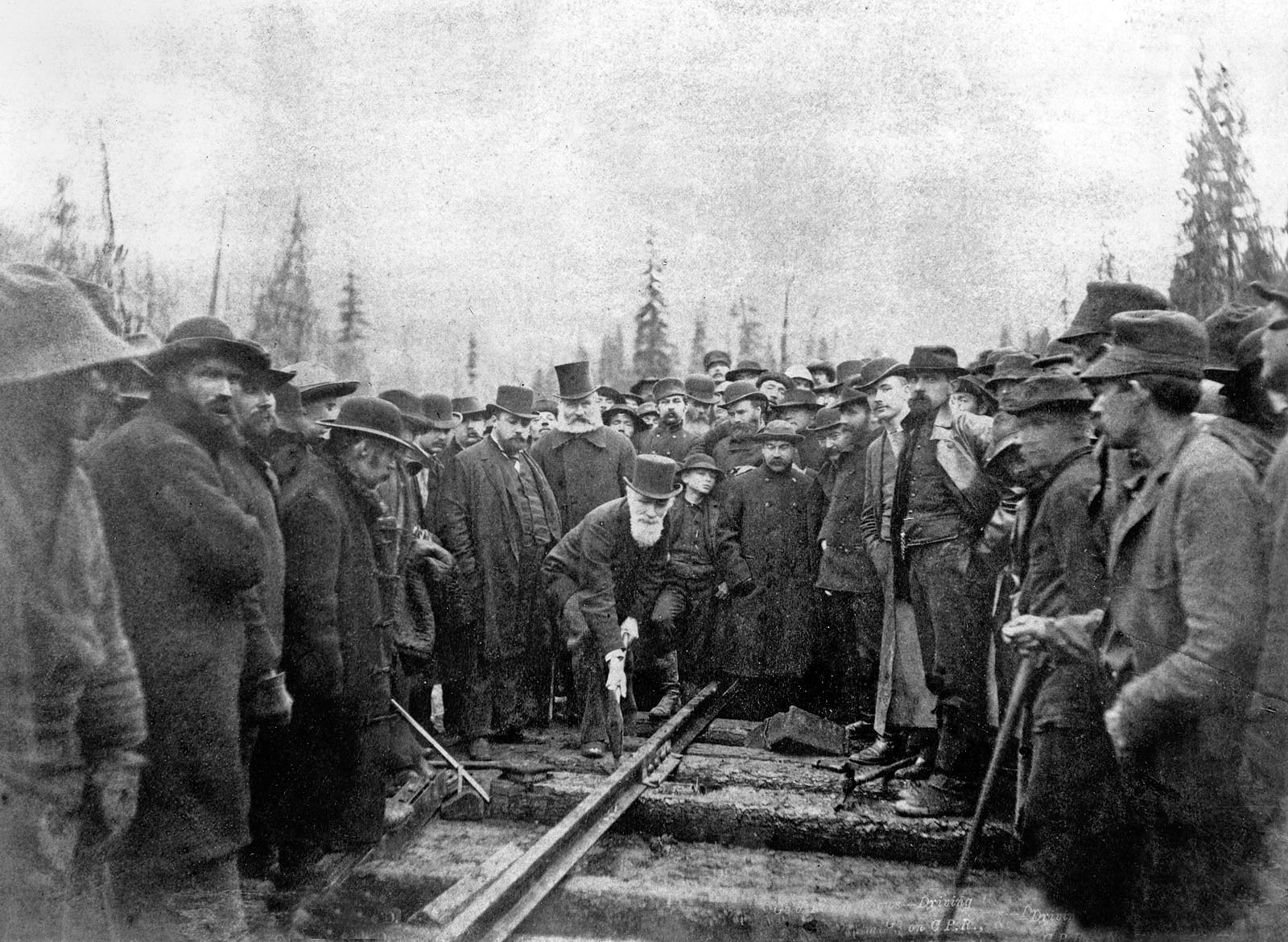
Lord Strathcona drives the Last Spike of the Canadian Pacific Railway, at Craigellachie, November 7, 1885. Completion of the transcontinental railroad was a condition of British Columbia's entry into Confederation.

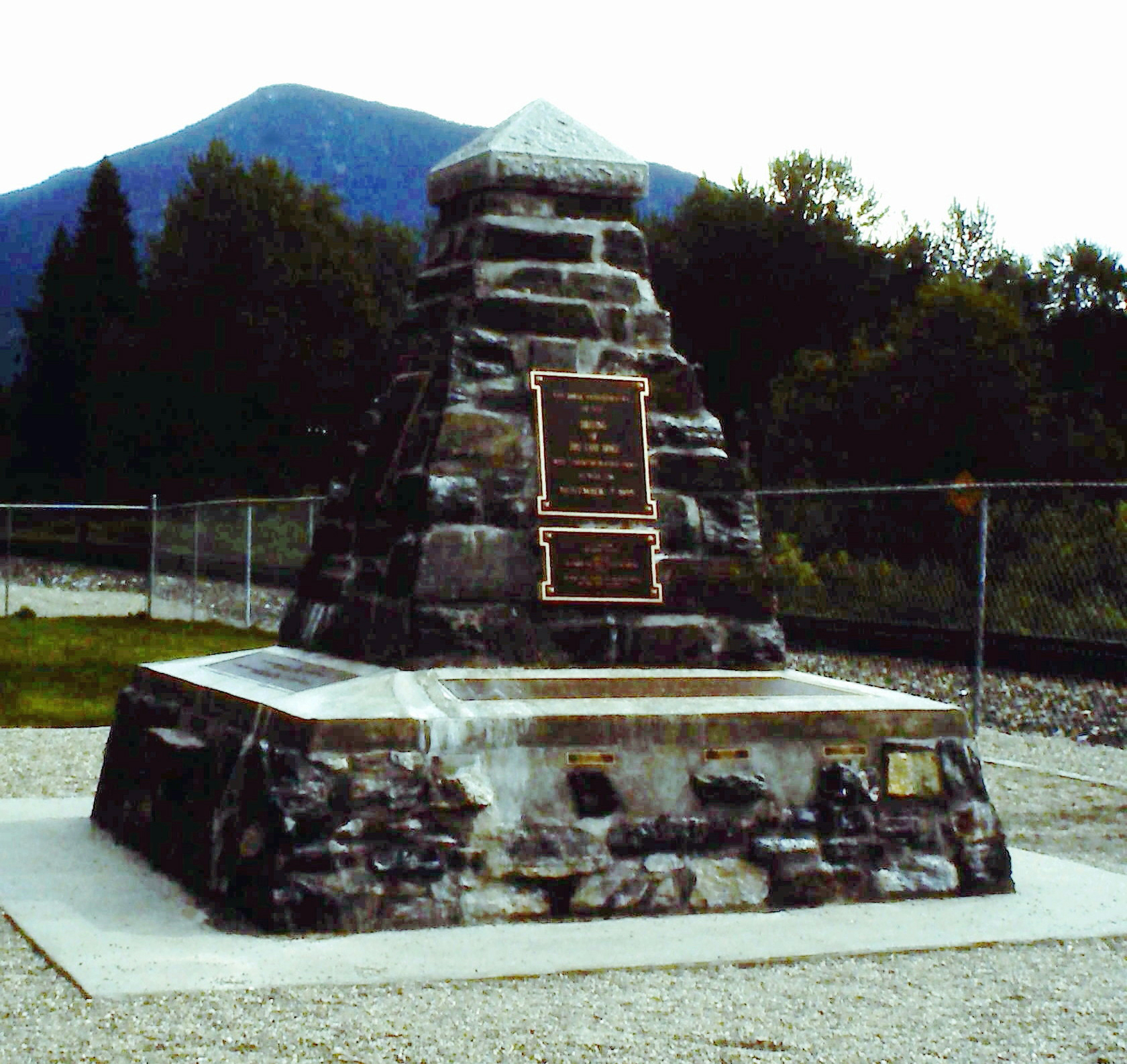
Memorial to the "last spike" in Craigellachie

The Confederation League led the chorus pressing for the colony to join Canada, which in 1867 had been created out of three British North American colonies (the Province of Canada, Nova Scotia and New Brunswick), making up four provinces. With the agreement by the Canadian government to extend the Canadian Pacific Railway to British Columbia and assume the colony's debt, British Columbia became the sixth province to join Confederation on July 20, 1871.

The Treaty of Washington sent the "Pig War", a San Juan Islands border dispute, to arbitration in 1871. In 1903, the province's territory shrank again after the Alaska boundary dispute settled the vague boundary of the Alaska Panhandle.

Population in British Columbia expanded as mining, forestry, agriculture, and fishing developed. Mining activity was notable throughout the Mainland, so a common epithet for it, even after provincehood, was "the Gold Colony". Agriculture attracted settlers to the fertile Fraser Valley. Cattle ranchers and later fruit growers came to the drier grasslands of the Thompson Rivers, the Cariboo, the Chilcotin, and the Okanagan. Forestry drew workers to the temperate rainforests of the coast, which was also the locus of a growing fishery.

The completion of the railway in 1885 contributed to the economy, facilitating the transportation of the region's considerable resources to the east. The milltown of Granville, also known as Gastown, was selected as the terminus. This prompted the incorporation of the city of Vancouver in 1886. The completion of the Port of Vancouver spurred rapid growth, and in less than fifty years the city surpassed Winnipeg, Manitoba, as the largest in Western Canada. The early decades of the province were ones in which issues of land use—specifically, its settlement and development—were paramount. This included expropriation from First Nations people of their land, control over its resources, as well as the ability to trade in some resources, such as fishing.

Establishing a labour force to develop the province was problematic, and British Columbia was a destination of immigration from Europe, China, Japan and India. The influx of a non-European population stimulated resentment from the dominant ethnic groups, resulting in agitation and an attempt to restrict the ability of Asian people to immigrate to British Columbia through the imposition of the Chinese head tax. This resentment culminated in mob attacks against Chinese and Japanese immigrants in Vancouver in 1887 and 1907.

=== 20th century ===
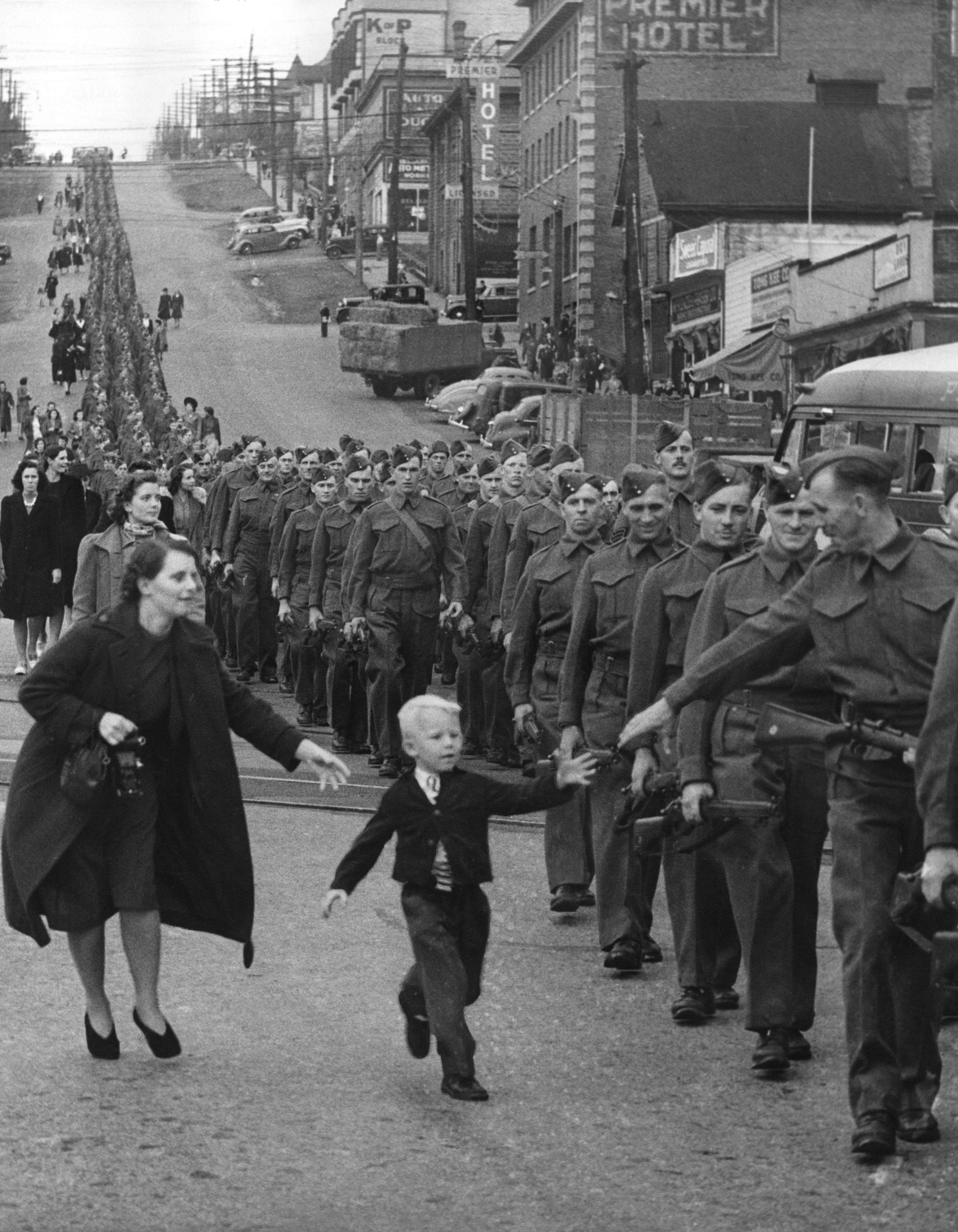
Wait for Me, Daddy, a photo taken by Claude P. Dettloff of the British Columbia Regiment marching in New Westminster, October 1940

In World War I, the province responded strongly to the call to assist the British Empire against its German foes in French and Belgian battlefields. About 55,570 of the province's 400,000 residents, the highest per-capita rate in Canada, responded to the military's need. About 6,225 men from the province died in combat.

In 1914, a second transcontinental rail line, the Grand Trunk Pacific, was completed. This opened up the North Coast and Bulkley Valley region to new economic opportunities. What had previously been an almost exclusively fur-trading and subsistence economy soon became an area for forestry, farming, and mining. This sector attracted workers from Asia and Europe, leading to a diverse but conflict-ridden society. The early 20th century saw significant interaction between immigrants, First Nations, and economic forces. There was a rise in the labour movement, marked by strikes and conflicts such as the 1935 docker's strike at Ballantyne Pier and the On-to-Ottawa Trek. These events underscored tensions between workers and big business, often mediated by the Communist Party. Racial and ethnic relations were strained, with legislation reflecting the era's racial prejudices, notably against Asian immigrants and First Nations. The early and mid-20th century was marred by incidents like the Komagata Maru incident, highlighting anti-Asian sentiment.

The interwar period and World War II introduced significant changes, including prohibition and its eventual repeal, and the internment of Japanese Canadians. The post-war era saw coalition governments and a booming economy, spearheaded by infrastructure projects and industrial expansion. The Social Credit Party, under W.A.C. Bennett, dominated BC politics, initiating major projects and laying the groundwork for future economic growth. The 1970s and 1980s brought economic challenges and political shifts, culminating in the Expo 86 world's fair and the end of Social Credit dominance. This period also saw significant social movements, such as Operation Solidarity. There was a transition to New Democratic Party governance in the 1990s, focusing on environmental conservation and economic struggles. In its second term especially, the NDP government faced political scandals, such as the fast ferry scandal, that ultimately contributed to its downfall.

=== 21st century ===
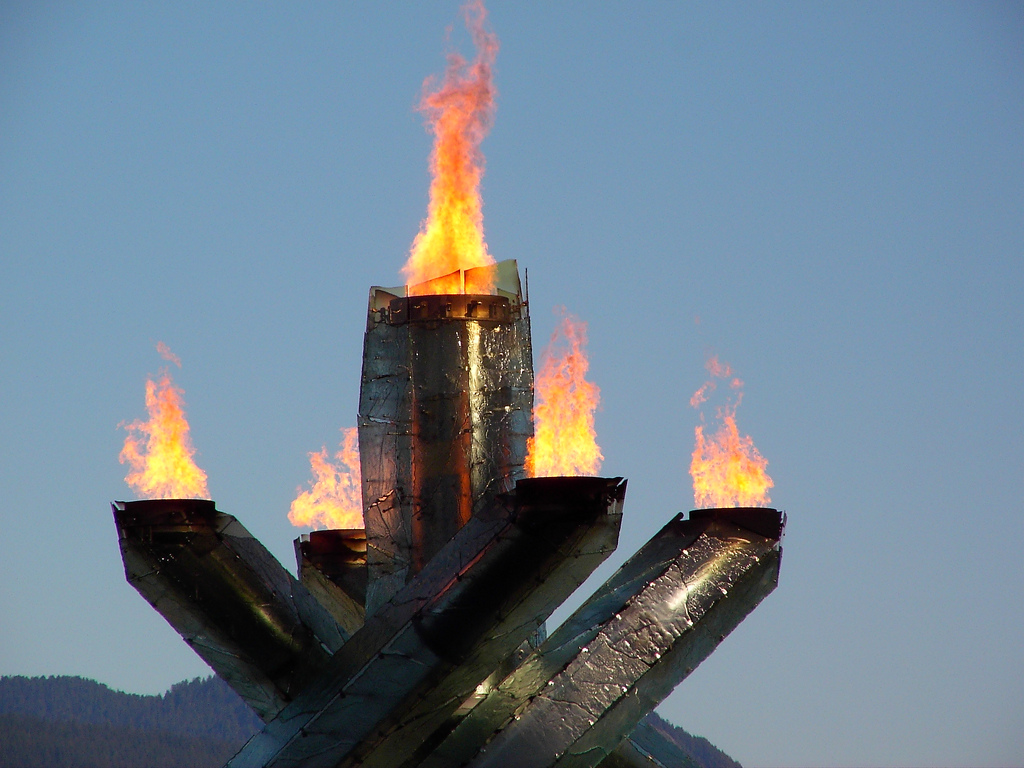
The cauldron of the 2010 Winter Olympics in Vancouver

In the 2001 provincial election, Gordon Campbell's Liberals defeated the NDP, gaining 77 out of 79 total seats in the provincial legislature. Campbell instituted reforms and removed some of the NDP's policies, along with selling off the previous government's "fast ferries", lowering income taxes, and instituting the controversial long-term lease of BC Rail to Canadian National Railway. Campbell led his party to victory in the 2005 provincial election against a substantially strengthened NDP opposition and won a third term in the 2009 provincial election.

The province won a bid to host the 2010 Winter Olympics in Vancouver and Whistler. In 2003, Vancouver's residents had voted in a referendum accepting the responsibilities of the host city should it win its bid. 64 percent of residents voted in favour of hosting. After the Olympic joy faded, Campbell's popularity fell. His management style, implementation of the Harmonized Sales Tax (HST) despite election promises not to introduce it, and cancellation of the BC Rail corruption trial led to low approval ratings and loss of caucus support: he resigned in November 2010. In early 2011, former deputy premier Christy Clark became leader of the Liberals. Early Clark government actions included raising the minimum wage, creating a new statutory holiday in February called "Family Day", and pushing the development of BC's liquefied natural gas industry. In the lead-up to the 2013 election, the Liberals lagged behind the NDP by a double-digit gap in the polls but were able to achieve a surprise victory, winning a majority and making Clark the first woman to lead a party to victory in BC. Her government went on to balance the budget, implement changes to liquor laws and continue with the question of the proposed Enbridge Northern Gateway Pipelines. In the 2017 election, the NDP formed a minority government with the support of the Green Party through a confidence and supply agreement. In July 2017, NDP leader John Horgan was sworn in as a premier. Clark resigned and Andrew Wilkinson became leader of the BC Liberals. In the 2020 British Columbia general election, the NDP won 57 seats and formed a majority government. Wilkinson resigned as the leader of the BC Liberals.

British Columbia has been significantly affected by demographic changes within Canada and around the world. Vancouver was a major destination for many immigrants from Hong Kong who left the former UK colony prior to its handover to China. Trends of urbanization mean the Greater Vancouver area now includes 51 percent of the province's population, followed by Greater Victoria with 8 percent. These two metropolitan regions have dominated the demographics of BC.

By 2018, housing prices in Vancouver were the second-least affordable in the world. Many experts point to evidence of money-laundering from China as a contributing factor. The high price of residential real estate has led to the implementation of an empty homes tax, a housing speculation and vacancy tax, and a foreign buyers' tax on housing. The net number of people coming to BC from other provinces in 2016 was almost four times larger than in 2012 and BC was the largest net recipient of interprovincial migrants in Canada. In 2023, British Columbia experienced a net population loss of 8,624; a substantial percentage of which were people who moved to Alberta.

By 2021, the COVID-19 pandemic had had a major effect on the province, with over 2,000 deaths and 250,000 confirmed cases. However, the COVID-19 vaccine reduced the spread, with 78 percent of people in BC over the age of five having been fully vaccinated. Also in 2021 but unrelated to COVID-19, the unmarked gravesites of hundreds of Indigenous children were discovered at three former Indian residential schools (Kamloops, St. Eugene's Mission, Kuper Island).

Wildfires burned more than 1,000,000 hectares (2,500,000 acres) of British Columbia in 2017, 2018, 2023, and 2024. Wildfires in 2023 burned nearly 3,000,000 hectares (7,400,000 acres) and incurred a cost of more than a billion dollars.

== Demographics ==
=== Population ===
Population density map of British Columbia

Statistics Canada's 2021 Canadian census recorded a population of 5,000,879—making British Columbia Canada's third-most populous province after Ontario and Quebec.

==== Cities ====
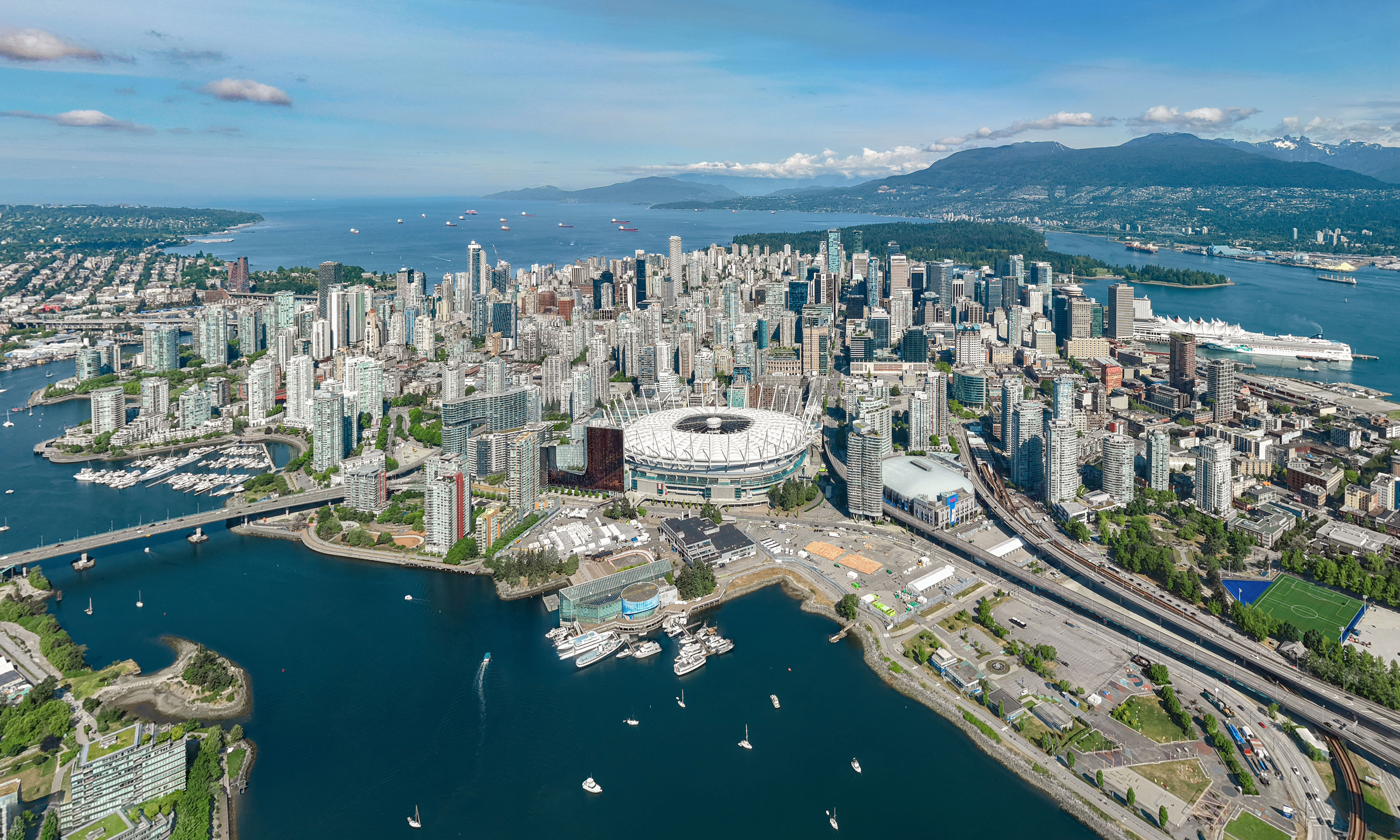
The Vancouver skyline

Half of all British Columbians live in the Metro Vancouver Regional District, which includes Vancouver, Surrey, Burnaby, Richmond, Coquitlam, Langley city, Langley district, Delta, North Vancouver district, Maple Ridge, New Westminster, Port Coquitlam, North Vancouver city, West Vancouver, Port Moody, White Rock, Pitt Meadows, Bowen Island, Anmore, Lions Bay, Belcarra, and Tsawwassen with adjacent unincorporated areas (including the University Endowment Lands) represented in the regional district as the electoral area known as Greater Vancouver Electoral Area A. The metropolitan area also includes nine First Nations.

The second largest concentration of British Columbia population is at the southern tip of Vancouver Island, which is made up of the 13 municipalities of Greater Victoria, Victoria, Saanich, Esquimalt, Oak Bay, View Royal, Highlands, Colwood, Langford, Central Saanich/Saanichton, North Saanich, Sidney, Metchosin, Sooke, which are part of the Capital Regional District. The metropolitan area also includes several Indian reserves (the governments of which are not part of the regional district). Almost half of the Vancouver Island population is in Greater Victoria.

Census metropolitan areas by population
#	Census metropolitan area	2021	2016
1	Vancouver	2,642,825	2,463,431
2	Victoria	397,237	367,770
3	Kelowna	222,162	194,882
4	Abbotsford	195,726	180,518
5	Nanaimo	115,459	104,936
6	Kamloops	114,142	103,811
7	Chilliwack	113,767	101,512

Ten largest municipalities by population
#	Municipality	2021	2016
1	Vancouver	662,248	631,486
2	Surrey	568,322	517,887
3	Burnaby	249,125	232,755
4	Richmond	209,937	198,309
5	Abbotsford	153,524	141,397
6	Coquitlam	148,625	139,284
7	Kelowna	144,576	127,380
8	Langley	132,603	117,285
9	Saanich	117,735	114,148
10	Delta	108,455	102,238

=== Cultural origins ===
British Columbia is the most diverse province in Canada; as of 2021, the province had the highest proportion of visible minorities in the country. The five largest pan-ethnic groups in the province are Europeans (60 percent), East Asians (14 percent), South Asians (10 percent), Indigenous (6 percent), and Southeast Asians (5 percent).

Top ethnic origins in BC (2016 census) (Note: Statistics represent both single (for example, "German") and multiple (for example, "Chinese-English") responses to the 2016 census and thus do not add up to 100 percent. All items are self-identified.)
#	Ethnic origin	Population	Percent
1	English	1,203,540	26.39%
2	Canadian	866,530	19%
3	Scottish	860,775	18.88%
4	Irish	675,135	14.80%
5	German	603,265	13.23%
6	Chinese	540,155	11.84%
7	French	388,815	8.53%
8	Indian	309,315	6.78%
9	Ukrainian	229,205	5.03%
10	First Nations	220,245	4.83%

=== Visible minorities and Indigenous peoples ===
In 2021, 34.4 percent of the population consisted of visible minorities and 5.9 percent of the population was Indigenous, mostly of First Nations and Métis descent.

Visible minority and Indigenous population (2021 Canadian census)
Population group		Population	%
European (Note: Statistic includes all persons that did not make up part of a visible minority or an indigenous identity.)		2,936,245	59.7%
Visible minority group	South Asian	473,965	9.6%
Visible minority group	Chinese	550,590	11.2%
Visible minority group	Black	61,760	1.3%
Visible minority group	Filipino	174,280	3.5%
Visible minority group	Arab	28,010	0.6%
Visible minority group	Latin American	65,970	1.3%
Visible minority group	Southeast Asian	71,785	1.5%
Visible minority group	West Asian	69,270	1.4%
Visible minority group	Korean	72,815	1.5%
Visible minority group	Japanese	44,120	0.9%
Visible minority group	Visible minority, n.i.e.	18,080	0.4%
Visible minority group	Multiple visible minorities	58,840	1.2%
Total visible minority population		1,689,490	34.4%
Indigenous group	First Nations (North American Indian)	180,085	3.7%
Indigenous group	Métis	97,860	2.0%
Indigenous group	Inuk (Inuit)	1,720	0.0%
Indigenous group	Multiple Indigenous responses	5,980	0.1%
Indigenous group	Indigenous responses n.i.e.	4,560	0.1%
Total Indigenous population		290,210	5.9%
Total population		4,915,945	100.0%

=== Religion ===
According to the 2021 census, religious groups in British Columbia included:

- Irreligion (2,559,250 persons or 52.1%)
- Christianity (1,684,870 persons or 34.3%)
- Sikhism (290,870 persons or 5.9%)
- Islam (125,915 persons or 2.6%)
- Buddhism (83,860 persons or 1.7%)
- Hinduism (81,320 persons or 1.7%)
- Judaism (26,850 persons or 0.5%)
- Indigenous spirituality (11,570 persons or 0.2%)
- Other (51,440 persons or 1.0%)

=== Language ===
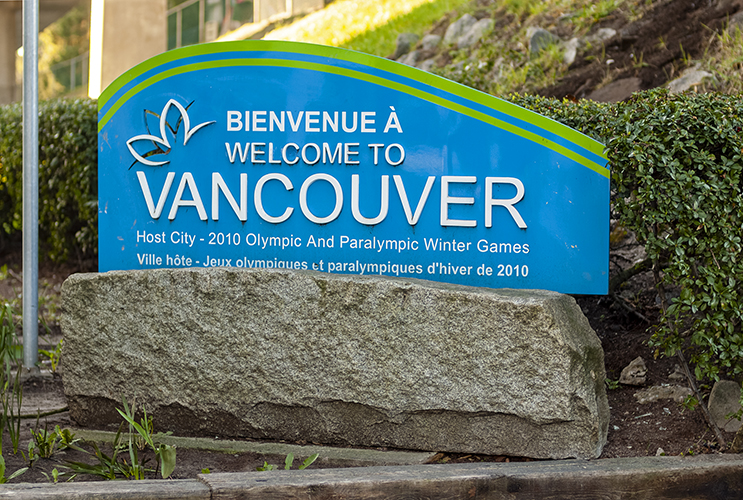
A Vancouver welcome sign in English and French

In the 2021 Canadian census, the ten most spoken languages in the province included English (4,753,280 or 96.69%), French (327,350 or 6.66%), Punjabi (315,000 or 6.41%), Mandarin (312,625 or 6.36%), Cantonese (246,045 or 5.01%), Spanish (143,900 or 2.93%), Hindi (134,950 or 2.75%), Tagalog (133,780 or 2.72%), German (84,325 or 1.72%), and Korean (69,935 or 1.42%). The question on knowledge of languages allows for multiple responses.

Of the 4,648,055 population counted by the 2016 census, 4,598,415 people completed the section about language. Of these, 4,494,995 gave singular responses to the question regarding their first language. The languages most commonly reported were the following:

Most common reported mother tongue in BC (2016)
#	Language	Population	Percent
1	English	3,170,110	70.52%
2	Punjabi	198,805	4.42%
3	Cantonese	193,530	4.31%
4	Mandarin	186,325	4.15%
5	Tagalog (Filipino)	78,770	1.75%
6	German	66,885	1.49%
7	French	55,325	1.23%
8	Korean	52,160	1.17%
9	Spanish	47,010	1.05%
10	Persian	43,470	0.97%

While these languages all reflect the last centuries of colonialism and recent immigration, British Columbia is home to 34 Indigenous languages. They are spoken by about 6,000 people in total, with 4,000 people fluent in their Indigenous languages.

== Economy ==
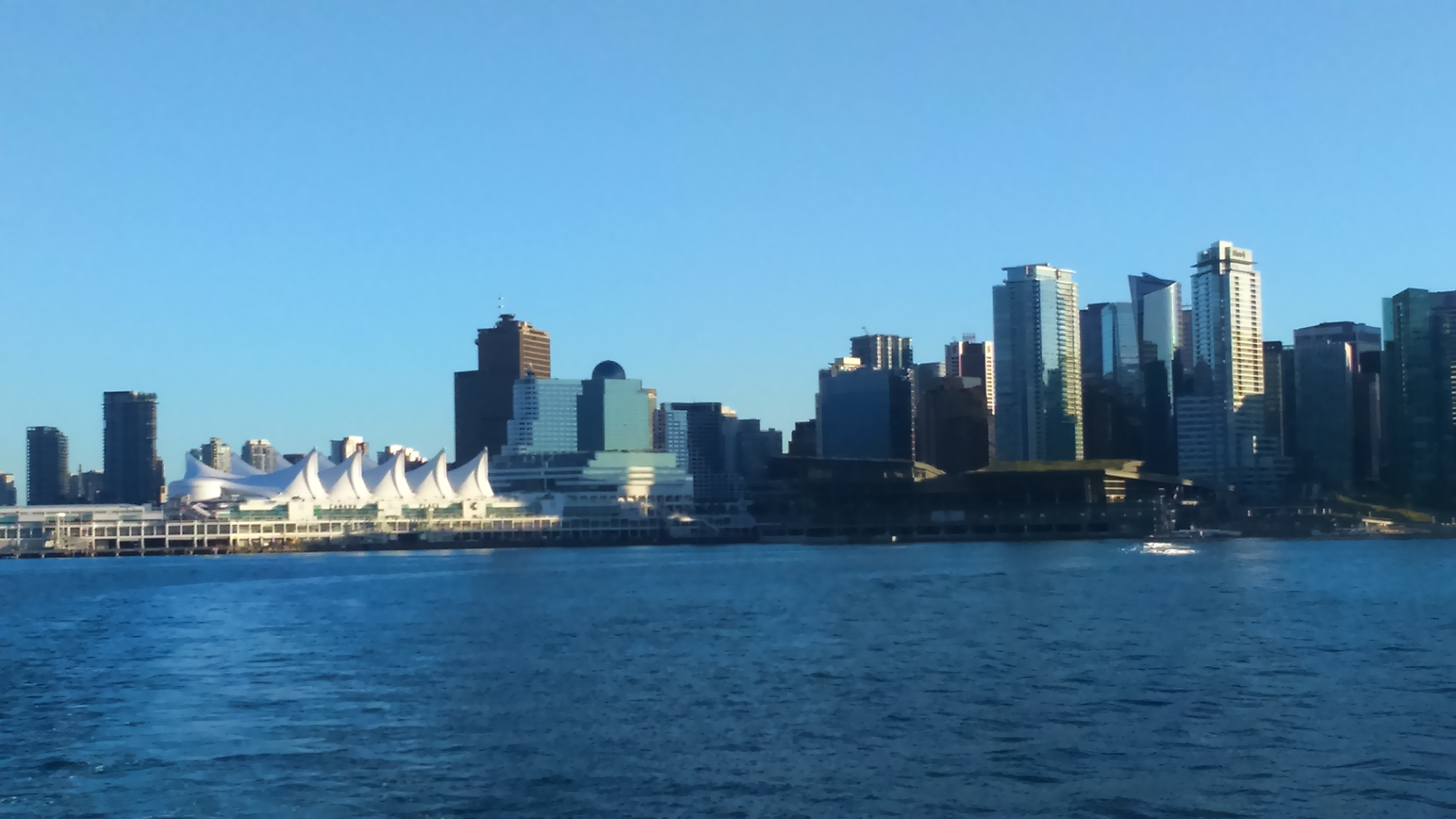
Canada Place in Downtown Vancouver

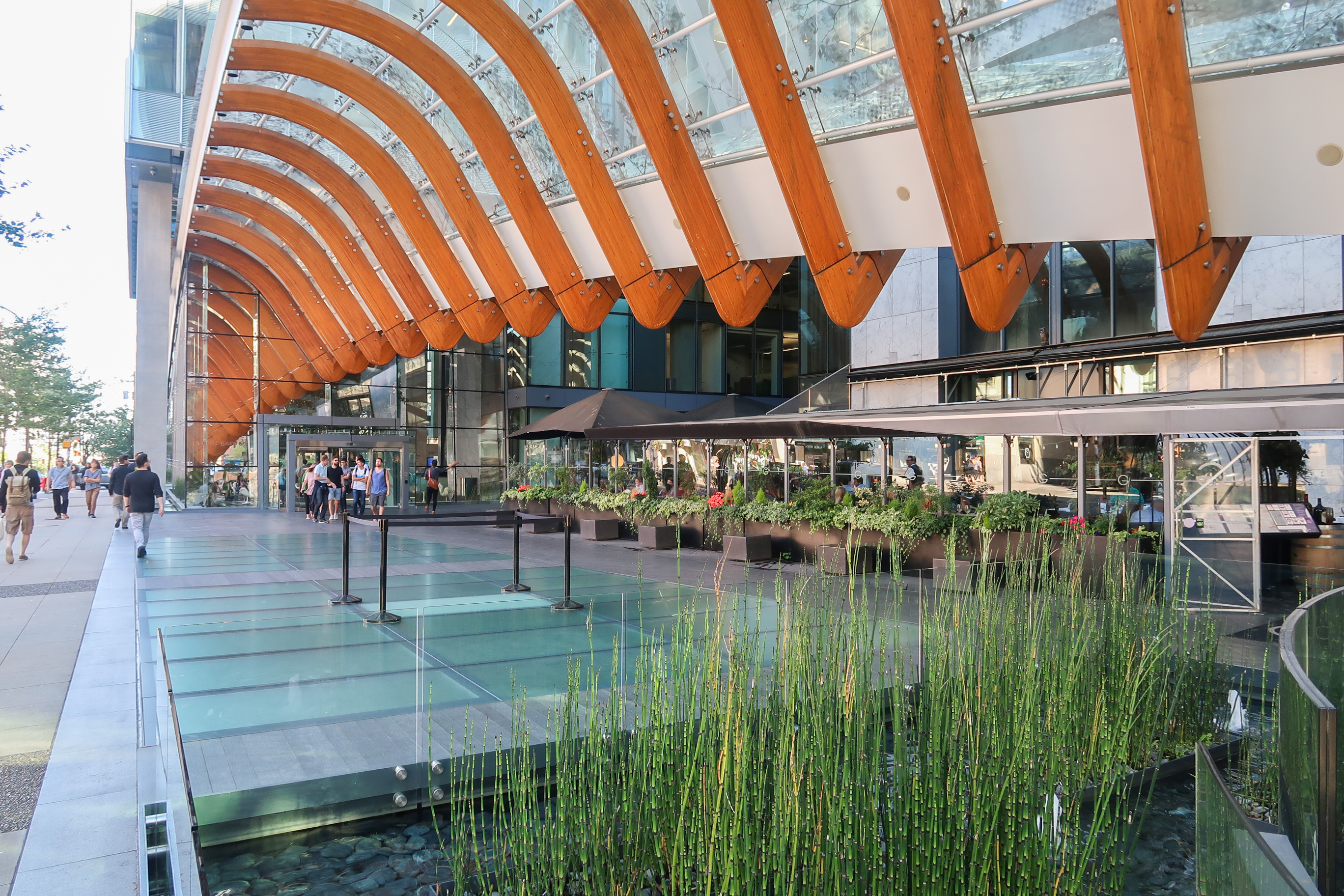
The entrance to Telus Garden

BC's economy is diverse, with service-producing industries accounting for the largest portion of the province's GDP. It is the terminus of two transcontinental railways, and the site of 27 major marine cargo and passenger terminals. Though less than 5 percent of its vast 944,735 square kilometres (364,764 sq mi) land is arable, the province is agriculturally rich (particularly in the Fraser and Okanagan valleys), because of milder weather near the coast and in certain sheltered southern valleys.

Its climate encourages outdoor recreation and tourism, though its economic mainstay has long been resource extraction, principally logging, farming, and mining. Vancouver, the province's largest city, serves as the headquarters of many western-based natural resource companies. It also benefits from a strong housing market and a per capita income well above the national average. While the coast of British Columbia and some valleys in the south-central part of the province have mild weather, the majority of its land mass experiences a cold-winter-temperate climate similar to the rest of Canada. The Northern Interior region has a subarctic climate with very cold winters. The climate of Vancouver is by far the mildest winter climate of the major Canadian cities, with nighttime January temperatures averaging above the freezing point.

British Columbia has a history of being a resource dominated economy, centred on the forestry industry but also with fluctuating importance in mining. Employment in the resource sector has fallen steadily as a percentage of employment, and new jobs are mostly in the construction and retail/service sectors. It now has the highest percentage of service industry jobs in the west, constituting 72 percent of industry, compared to the 60 percent Western Canadian average. The largest section of this employment is in finance, insurance, real estate and corporate management; however, many areas outside of metropolitan areas are still heavily reliant on resource extraction. With its film industry known as Hollywood North, the Vancouver region is the third-largest feature film production location in North America, after Los Angeles and New York City.

The economic history of British Columbia is replete with tales of dramatic upswings and downswings. This boom and bust pattern has influenced the politics, culture and business climate of the province. Economic activity related to mining in particular has widely fluctuated with changes in commodity prices over time, with documented costs to community health.

In 2020, British Columbia had the third-largest GDP in Canada, with a GDP of $309 billion and a GDP per capita of $60,090. British Columbia's debt-to-GDP ratio is edging up to 15.0 percent in fiscal year 2019–20, and it is expected to reach 16.1 percent by 2021–22. British Columbia's economy experienced strong growth in recent years with a total growth rate of 9.6% from 2017 to 2021, a growth rate that was second in the country.

== Government and politics ==
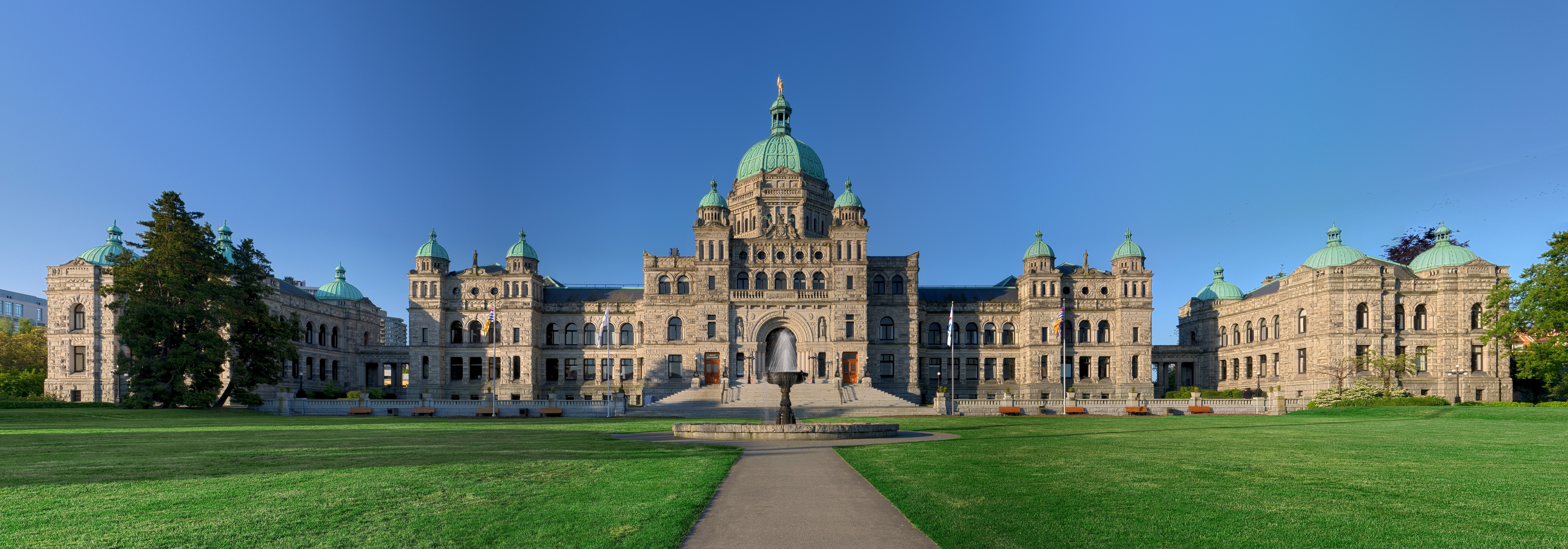
The British Columbia Parliament Buildings in Victoria

The lieutenant governor, Wendy Lisogar-Cocchia, is the Crown's representative in the province. During the absence of the lieutenant governor, the Governor in Council (federal Cabinet) may appoint an administrator to execute the duties of the office. This is usually the chief justice of British Columbia. British Columbia is divided into regional districts to better enable municipalities and rural areas to work together at a regional level.

British Columbia has a 93-member elected legislative assembly, elected by the plurality voting system, though from 2003 to 2009 there was significant debate about switching to a single transferable vote system called BC-STV. The government of the day appoints ministers for various portfolios, what are officially part of the Executive Council, of whom the province's premier is chair.

Lorne Doerkson is premier, BC's head of government.

The province is currently governed by the British Columbia New Democratic Party (BC NDP) under Premier David Eby. The 2017 provincial election saw the Liberal Party take 43 seats, the NDP take 41, and the British Columbia Green Party take 3. No party met the minimum of 44 seats for a majority, therefore leading to the first minority government since 1953. Following the election, the Greens entered into negotiations with both the Liberals and NDP, eventually announcing they would support an NDP minority government.

Previously, the right-of-centre British Columbia Liberal Party governed the province for 16 years between 2001 and 2017, and won the largest landslide election in British Columbia history in 2001, with 77 of 79 seats. The legislature became more evenly divided between the Liberals and NDP following the 2005 (46 Liberal seats of 79) and 2009 (49 Liberal seats of 85) provincial elections. The NDP and its predecessor the Co-operative Commonwealth Federation (CCF) have been the main opposition force to right-wing parties since the 1930s and have governed with majority governments in 1972–1975, 1991–2001 and since 2020, with a minority government from 2017 to 2020. The Green Party plays a larger role in the politics of British Columbia than Green parties do in most other jurisdictions in Canada. After a breakthrough election in 2001 (12.39 percent), the party's vote share declined (2005 – 9.17 percent, 2009 – 8.09 percent, 2013 – 8.13 percent) before increasing again to a record high of 16.84 percent at the 2017 election.

The British Columbia Liberal Party is not related to the federal Liberal Party and does not share the same ideology. Instead, the BC Liberal party is a rather diverse coalition, made up of the remnants of the Social Credit Party, many federal Liberals, federal Conservatives, and those who would otherwise support right-of-centre or free enterprise parties. In 2022, Kevin Falcon was elected leader of the BC Liberals, promising to rename the party in an effort to distance themselves from their federal counterparts. In 2023, the party rebranded as BC United. Historically, there have commonly been third parties present in the legislature, including the Liberals themselves from 1952 to 1975. The BC Green Party is the current third party in British Columbia, with three seats in the legislature.

Prior to the rise of the Liberal Party, British Columbia's main political party was the BC Social Credit Party, which governed the province for 20 years. While sharing some ideology with the subsequent Liberal government, they were more right-wing, although they undertook nationalization of various important monopolies, notably BC Hydro and BC Ferries.

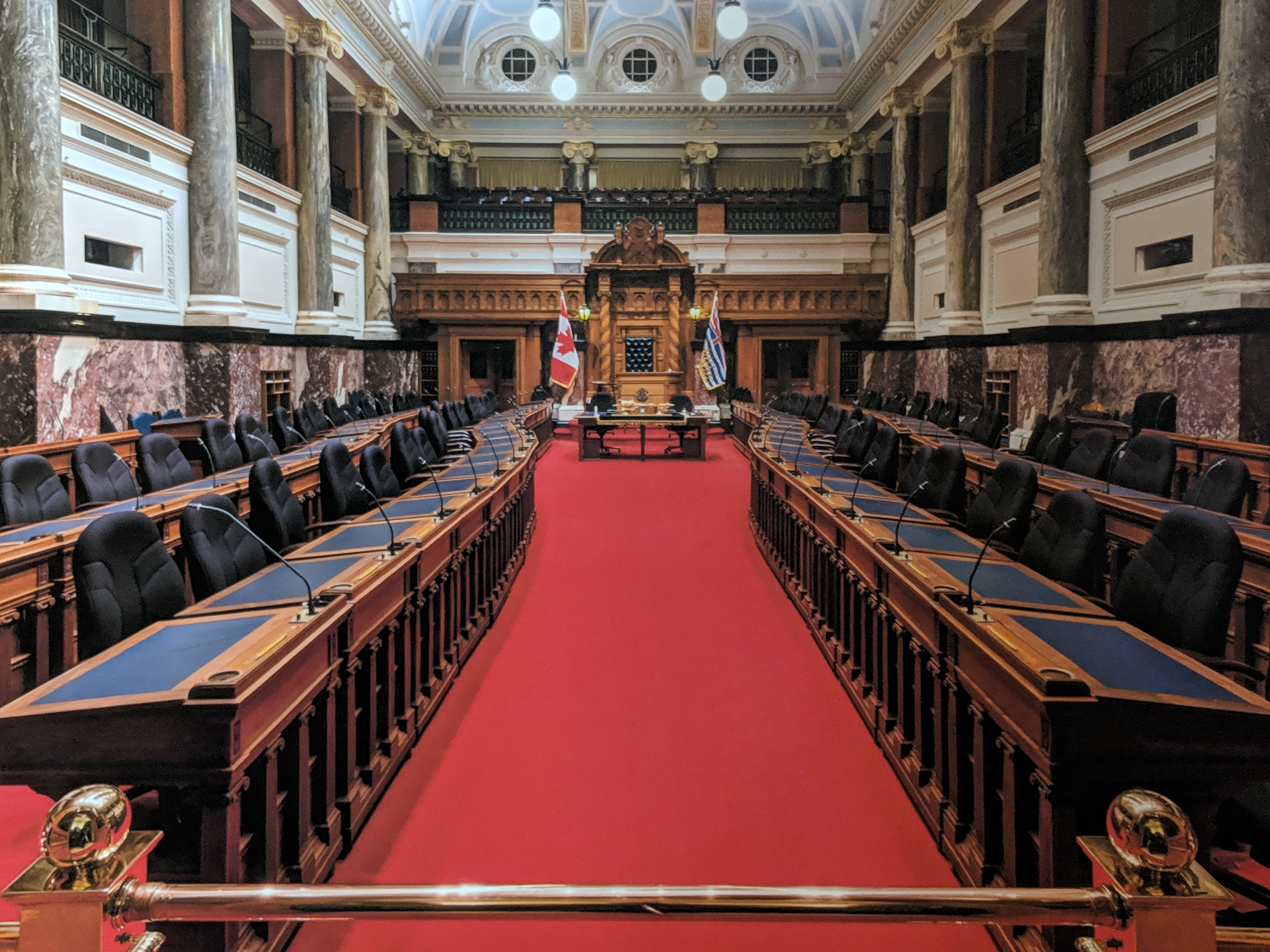
The meeting chamber of the Legislative Assembly

British Columbia is known for having politically active labour unions who have traditionally supported the NDP or its predecessor, the CCF.

British Columbia's political history is typified by scandal and a cast of colourful characters, beginning with colonial-era land scandals and abuses of power by early officials, such as those that led to McGowan's War in 1858–59. Notable scandals in Social Credit years included the Robert Bonner Affair and the Fantasy Gardens scandal which forced Premier Bill Vander Zalm to resign and ended the Social Credit era. NDP scandals included Bingogate, which brought down NDP Premier Mike Harcourt, and the alleged scandal named Casinogate which drove NDP Premier Glen Clark to resign.

A variety of scandals plagued the 2001–2017 Liberal government, including Premier Gordon Campbell's arrest for drunk driving in Maui and the resignation of various cabinet ministers because of conflict-of-interest allegations. A raid on the Parliament Buildings on December 28, 2003, in Victoria, including the Premier's Office, resulted in charges only for ministerial aides, although key cabinet members from the time resigned. Campbell eventually resigned in late 2010 due to opposition to his government's plan to introduce a Harmonized Sales Tax (HST) and was replaced by Christy Clark as premier in the 2011 BC Liberal leadership election.

British Columbia is underrepresented in the Senate of Canada, leading Premier Christy Clark to refuse to cooperate with the federal government's reforms for senate appointments to be made based on the recommendations of an advisory board that would use non-partisan criteria. Hours after that plan was unveiled in Ottawa on December 3, 2015, Clark issued a statement that it did "not address what's been wrong with the Senate since the beginning".

The imbalance in representation in that House is apparent when considering population size. The six senators from BC constitute only one for every 775,000 people vs. one for every 75,000 in Prince Edward Island, which has four senators. Nova Scotia and New Brunswick have much smaller populations than BC, yet each has ten senators according to a Global News summary. Correcting this imbalance would require a constitutional amendment, but that is unlikely to be supported by the Atlantic provinces.

=== Official symbols ===
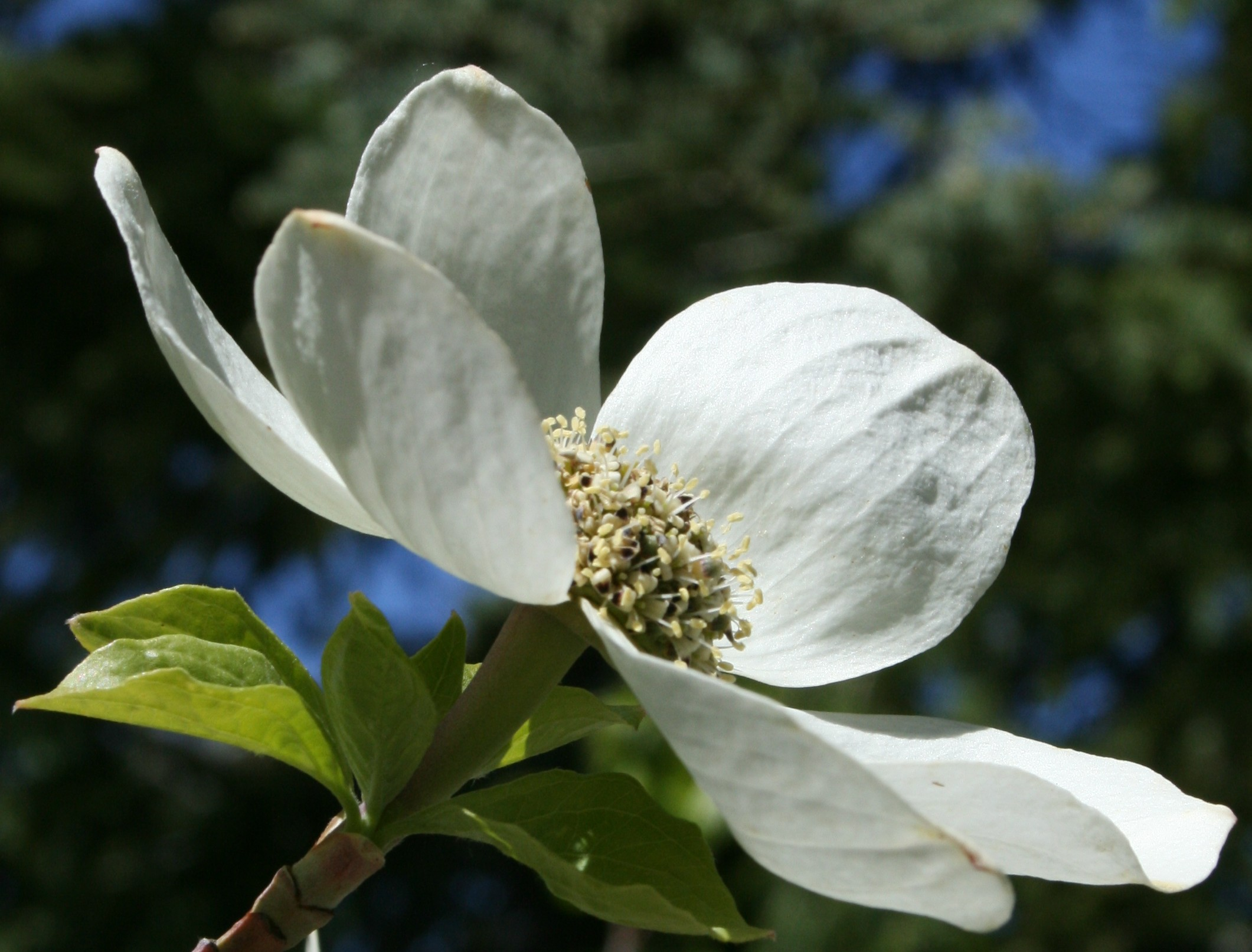
The flower of the Pacific dogwood is often associated with British Columbia.

The government of British Columbia has designated several official symbols:

- Flag: Flag of British Columbia
- Coat of arms: Coat of arms of British Columbia
- Floral emblem: Pacific dogwood
- Mineral emblem: Jade
- Tree emblem: Western red cedar
- Bird emblem: Steller's jay
- Mammal emblem: "Spirit" or Kermode bear
- Fish emblem: Pacific salmon
- Fossil emblem: Elasmosaur
- Tartan emblem: British Columbia Tartan

== Transportation ==
Transportation played a huge role in British Columbia's history. The Rocky Mountains and the ranges west of them constituted a significant obstacle to overland travel until the completion of the transcontinental railway in 1885. The Peace River Canyon through the Rocky Mountains was the route the earliest explorers and fur traders used. Fur trade routes were only marginally used for access to British Columbia through the mountains. Travel from the rest of Canada before 1885 meant the difficulty of overland travel via the United States, around Cape Horn or overseas from Asia. Nearly all travel and freight to and from the region occurred via the Pacific Ocean, primarily through the ports of Victoria and New Westminster.

Until the 1930s, rail was the only means of overland travel to and from the rest of Canada; travellers using motor vehicles needed to journey through the United States. With the construction of the Inter-Provincial Highway in 1932, now known as the Crowsnest Pass Highway, and later the Trans-Canada Highway, road transportation evolved into the preferred mode of overland travel to and from the rest of Canada.

As of 2021, the number of electric vehicles sold in British Columbia, as a percentage of total vehicle sales, was the highest of any Canadian province or US state.

=== Roads and highways ===
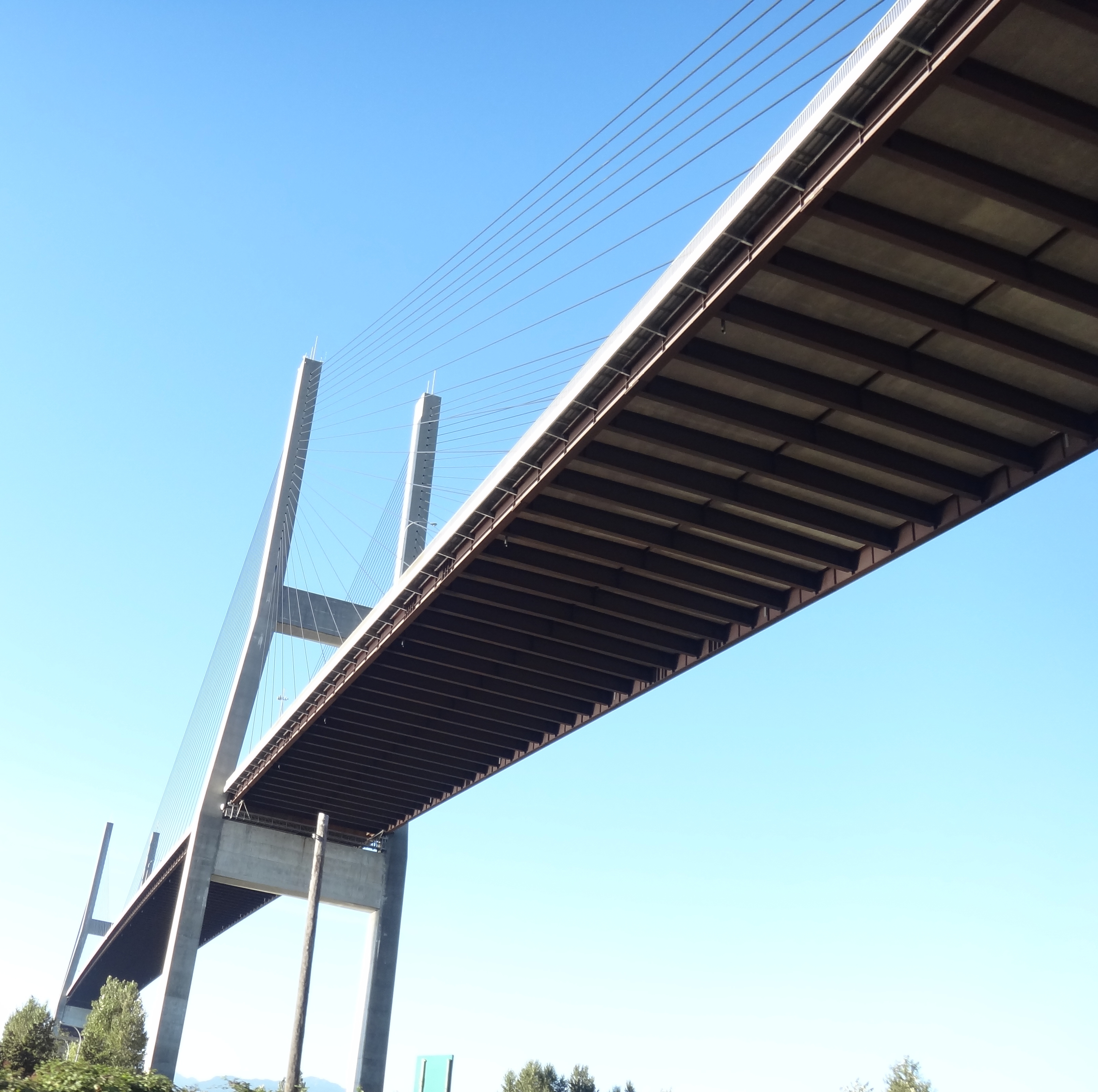
The Alex Fraser Bridge on Highway 91 between Richmond and Delta

Because of its size and rugged, varying topography, British Columbia requires thousands of kilometres of provincial highways to connect its communities. British Columbia's roads systems were notoriously poorly maintained and dangerous until a concentrated program of improvement was initiated in the 1950s and 1960s. There are now freeways in Greater Victoria, the Lower Mainland, and Central Interior of the province. Much of the rest of the province, where traffic volumes are generally low, is accessible by well-maintained generally high-mobility two-lane arterial highways with additional passing lanes in mountainous areas and usually only a few stop-controlled intersections outside the main urban areas.

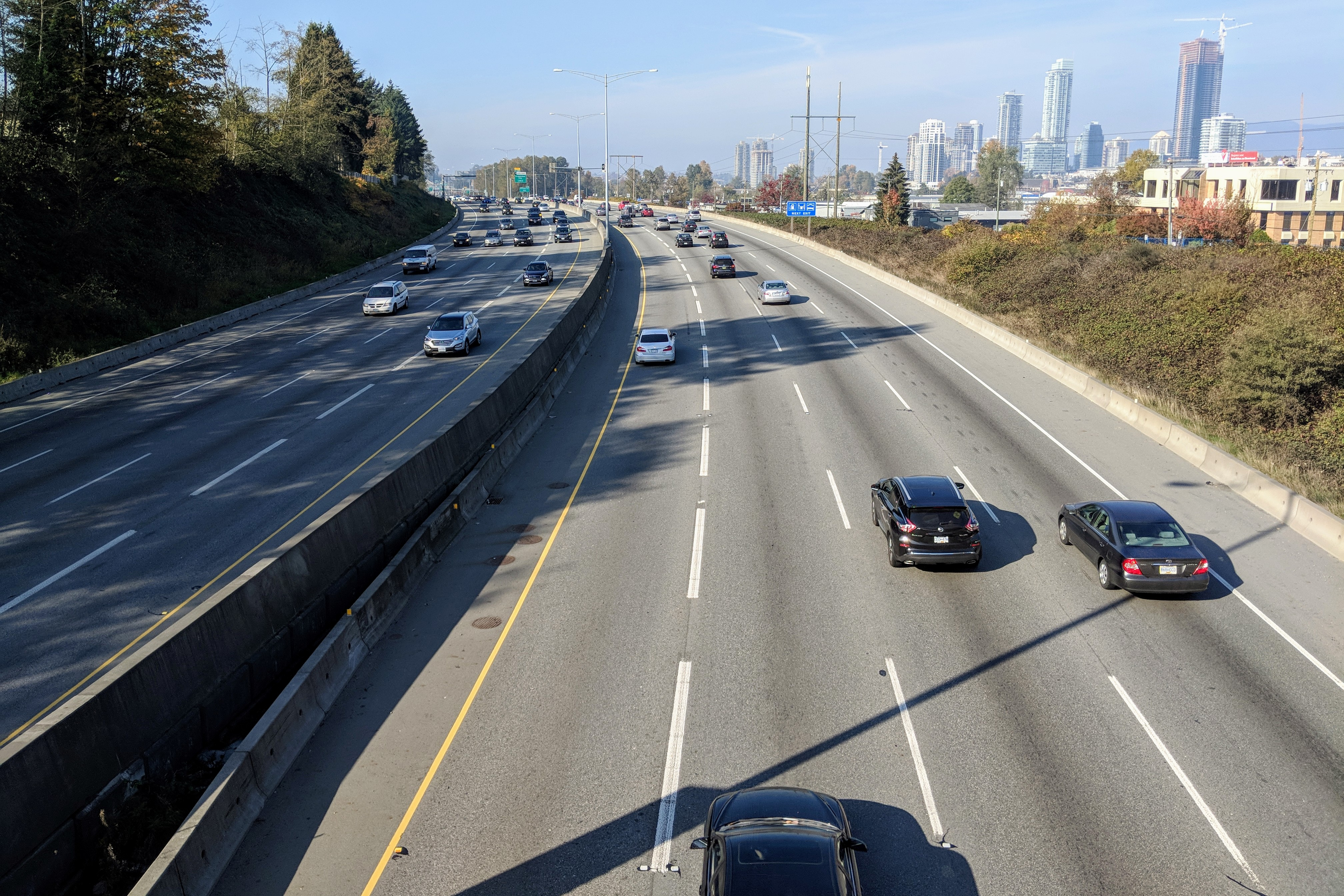
British Columbia Highway 1 near Brentwood, Burnaby

A couple of busy intercity corridors outside Greater Vancouver feature more heavily signalized limited-mobility arterial highways that are mostly four-lane and often divided by portable median traffic barriers. Highway 1 on Vancouver Island and Highway 97 through the Okanagan Valley are medium- to high-volume roadways with variable posted speeds that range from 50 km/h (31 mph) to maximums just slightly lower than the principal grade-separated highways.

Numerous traffic lights operate in place of interchanges on both arterials as long-term cost-cutting measures. Signalization along both these highways is heaviest through urban areas and along inter-urban sections where traffic volumes are similar to and sometimes higher than the freeways, but where funding is not available for upgrades to interchanges or construction of high-mobility alternative routes or bypasses. The building and maintenance of provincial highways is the responsibility of the British Columbia Ministry of Transportation and Infrastructure.

There are only five major routes to the rest of Canada. From south to north they are: BC Highway 3 through the Crowsnest Pass, the Vermilion Pass (Highway 93 in both British Columbia and Alberta), the Kicking Horse Pass, the latter being used by the Trans-Canada Highway entering Alberta through Banff National Park, the Yellowhead Highway (16) through Jasper National Park, and Highway 2 through Dawson Creek. There are also several highway crossings to the adjoining American states of Washington, Idaho, and Montana. The longest highway is Highway 97, running 2,081 kilometres (1,293 mi) from the British Columbia-Washington border at Osoyoos north to Watson Lake, Yukon and which includes the British Columbia portion of the Alaska Highway.

=== Public transit ===
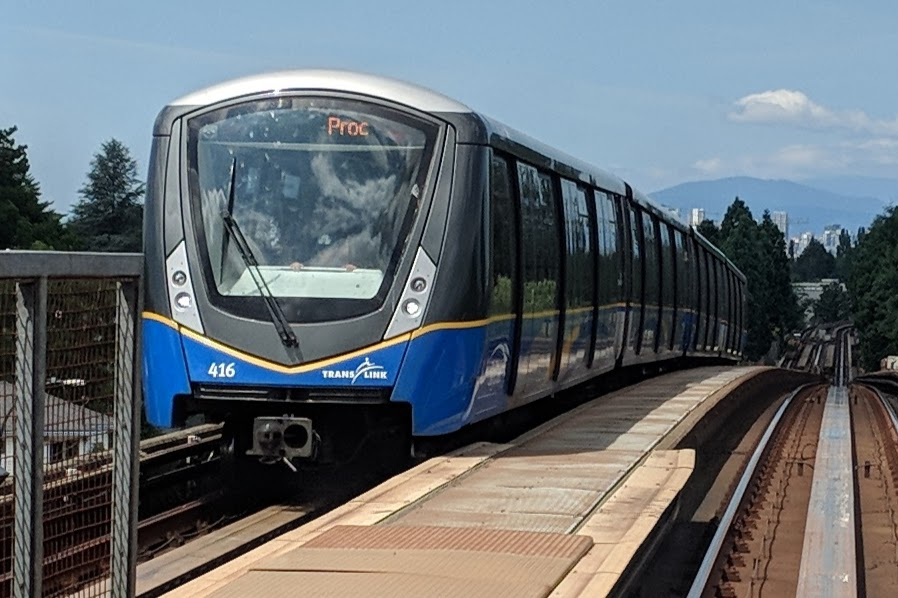
SkyTrain is the rail rapid transit system that serves Metro Vancouver.

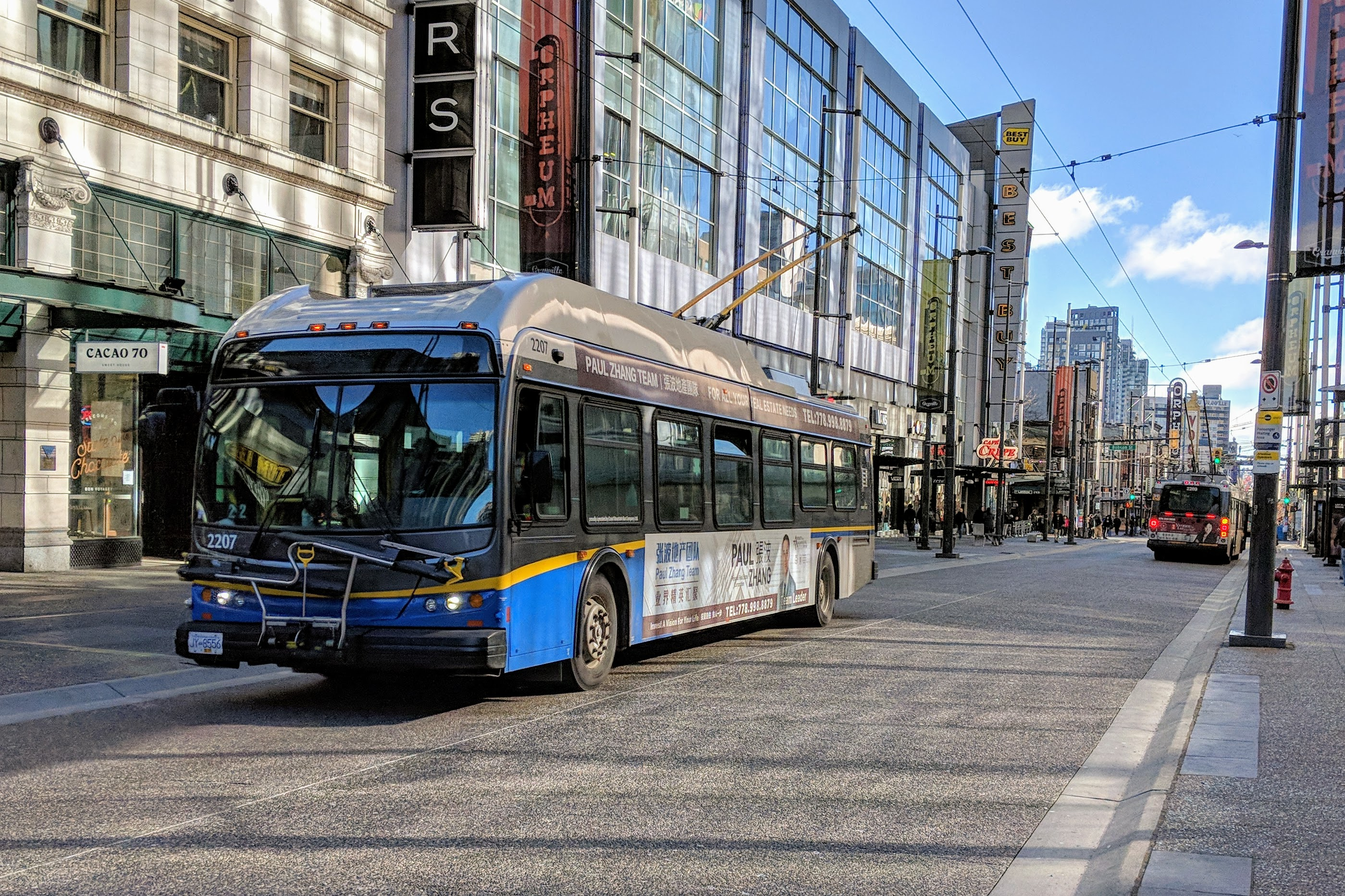
Trolley buses in Vancouver

Prior to 1979, surface public transit in the Vancouver and Victoria metropolitan areas was administered by BC Hydro, the provincially owned electricity utility. Subsequently, the province established BC Transit to oversee and operate all municipal transportation systems. In 1998, the Greater Vancouver Transportation Authority, now TransLink, a separate authority for routes within the Metro Vancouver Regional District, was established. Some smaller island communities, such as Gabriola Island and, formerly, Pender Island operate routes independent of BC Transit or TransLink.

In 2018, BC Transit expanded to provide intercity routes, particularly in the Northern region of British Columbia. Other intercity routes were introduced connecting southern communities in preparation of the cancellation of Greyhound Canada's pullout from Western Canada, though options for intercity bus travel are still extremely limited.

Public transit in British Columbia consists mainly of diesel buses, although Vancouver is also serviced by a fleet of trolley buses. Several experimental buses are being tested such as hybrid buses that have both gasoline and electric engines. Additionally, there are CNG-fuelled buses being tested and used in Nanaimo and Kamloops systems. British Columbia also tested a fleet of Hydrogen-fuelled buses for the Vancouver-Whistler Winter Olympics in 2010.

TransLink operates SkyTrain, an automated metro system serving the cities of Vancouver, Burnaby, New Westminster, Surrey, Richmond, Coquitlam, and Port Moody. In 2009, the Canada Line SkyTrain was completed, linking Vancouver International Airport and the city of Richmond to downtown Vancouver bringing the total to three operating metro lines.

A new extension to Coquitlam and Port Moody (the Evergreen Extension of the Millennium Line) was completed in December 2016. Construction of an extension of the Millennium Line westwards through Vancouver to Arbutus Street began in February 2021, with future plans to extend the line farther west from Arbutus station to the University of British Columbia. Fare gates have been added to all existing stations, though in the past, SkyTrain used a proof of payment honour system. In the capital city of Victoria, BC Transit and the provincial government's infrastructure ministry are working together to create a bus rapid transit from the Westshore communities to downtown Victoria. In Kamloops, there is a bus rapid transit GPS trial underway to see how bus rapid transit affects smaller cities, rather than larger ones, like Victoria and Vancouver.

=== Rail ===
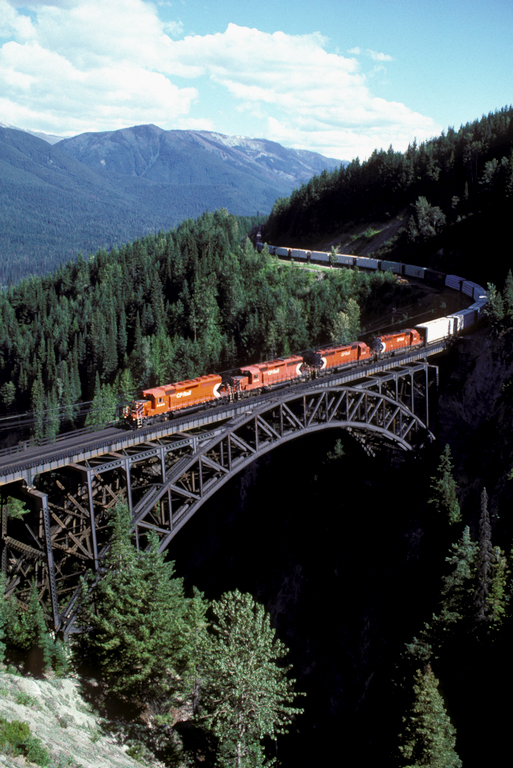
A CPR train traversing the Stoney Creek Bridge

Rail development expanded greatly in the decades after the Canadian Pacific Railway was completed, in 1885, and was the chief mode of long-distance surface transportation until the expansion and improvement of the provincial highways system began in the 1950s. Two major routes through the Yellowhead Pass competed with the Canadian Pacific Railway – the Grand Trunk Pacific Railway, terminating at Prince Rupert, and the Canadian Northern Railway, terminating at Vancouver.

The British Columbia Electric Railway provided rail services in Victoria and Vancouver between the nineteenth century and mid twentieth century.

The Pacific Great Eastern line supplemented this service, providing a north–south route between interior resource communities and the coast. The Pacific Great Eastern (later known as British Columbia Railway and now owned by Canadian National Railway) connects Fort St James, Fort Nelson, and Tumbler Ridge with North Vancouver. The E&N Railway, rebranded as the Island Rail Corridor, formerly served the commercial and passenger train markets of Vancouver Island. Service along the route is now minimal. Vancouver Island was host to the last logging railway in North America until its closure in 2017.

Current passenger services in British Columbia are limited. Via Rail operates 10 long-distance trains per week on two lines. Local services are limited to two regions, with TransLink providing rapid transit and commuter services in the Lower Mainland and by the Seton Lake Indian Band South of Lillooet with the Kaoham Shuttle. Amtrak runs international passenger service between Vancouver, Seattle, and intermediate points.

Several heritage railways operate within the province, including the White Pass and Yukon Route that runs between Alaska and the Yukon via British Columbia.

=== Water ===
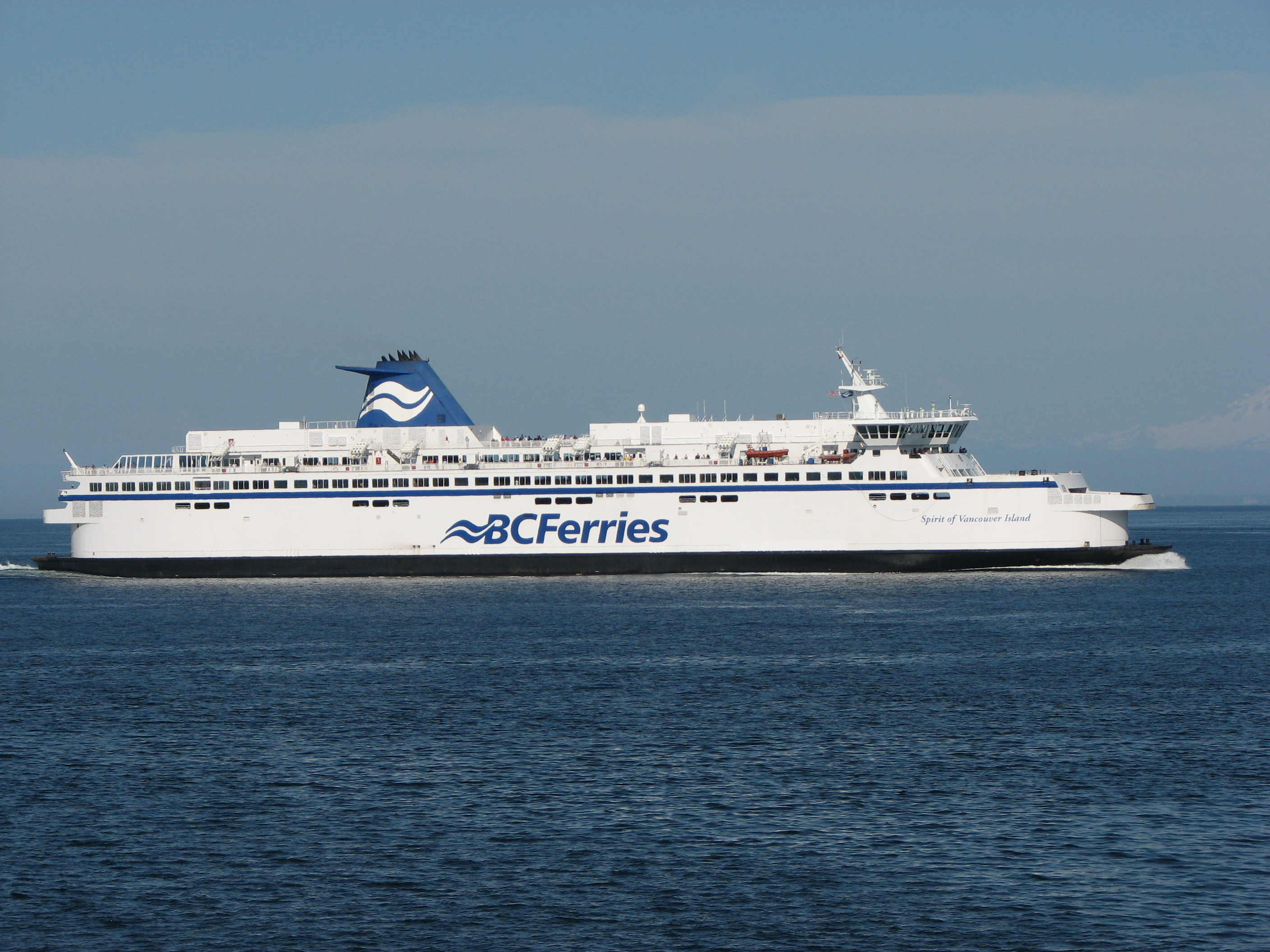
Spirit of Vancouver Island S-class ferry

BC Ferries was established as a provincial crown corporation in 1960 to provide passenger and vehicle ferry service between Vancouver Island and the Lower Mainland as a cheaper and more reliable alternative to the service operated by the Canadian Pacific Railway and other private operators. It now operates 25 routes among the islands of British Columbia, and between the islands and the mainland.

Ferry service to Washington is offered by the Washington State Ferries (between Sidney and Anacortes) and Black Ball Transport (between Victoria and Port Angeles, Washington). Ferry service over inland lakes and rivers is provided by the Ministry of Transportation and Infrastructure. Other coastal ferries are operated privately.

The SeaBus ferry connects Lonsdale Quay in the City of North Vancouver and Waterfront station in Vancouver.

Commercial ocean transport is of vital importance. Major ports are at Vancouver, Roberts Bank (near Tsawwassen), Prince Rupert, and Victoria.

Vancouver, Victoria, and Prince Rupert are also major ports of call for cruise ships. In 2007, a large maritime container port was opened in Prince Rupert with an inland sorting port in Prince George.

=== Air ===
There are over 200 airports throughout British Columbia, the major ones being the Vancouver International Airport, the Victoria International Airport, the Kelowna International Airport, and the Abbotsford International Airport, the first three of which each served over 1,000,000 passengers in 2005. As of 2017, Vancouver International Airport is the 2nd busiest airport in the country and the second biggest International Gateway on the west coast (after Los Angeles) with an estimated 26.4 million travellers passing through in 2019.

== Arts and culture ==
=== Visual arts ===
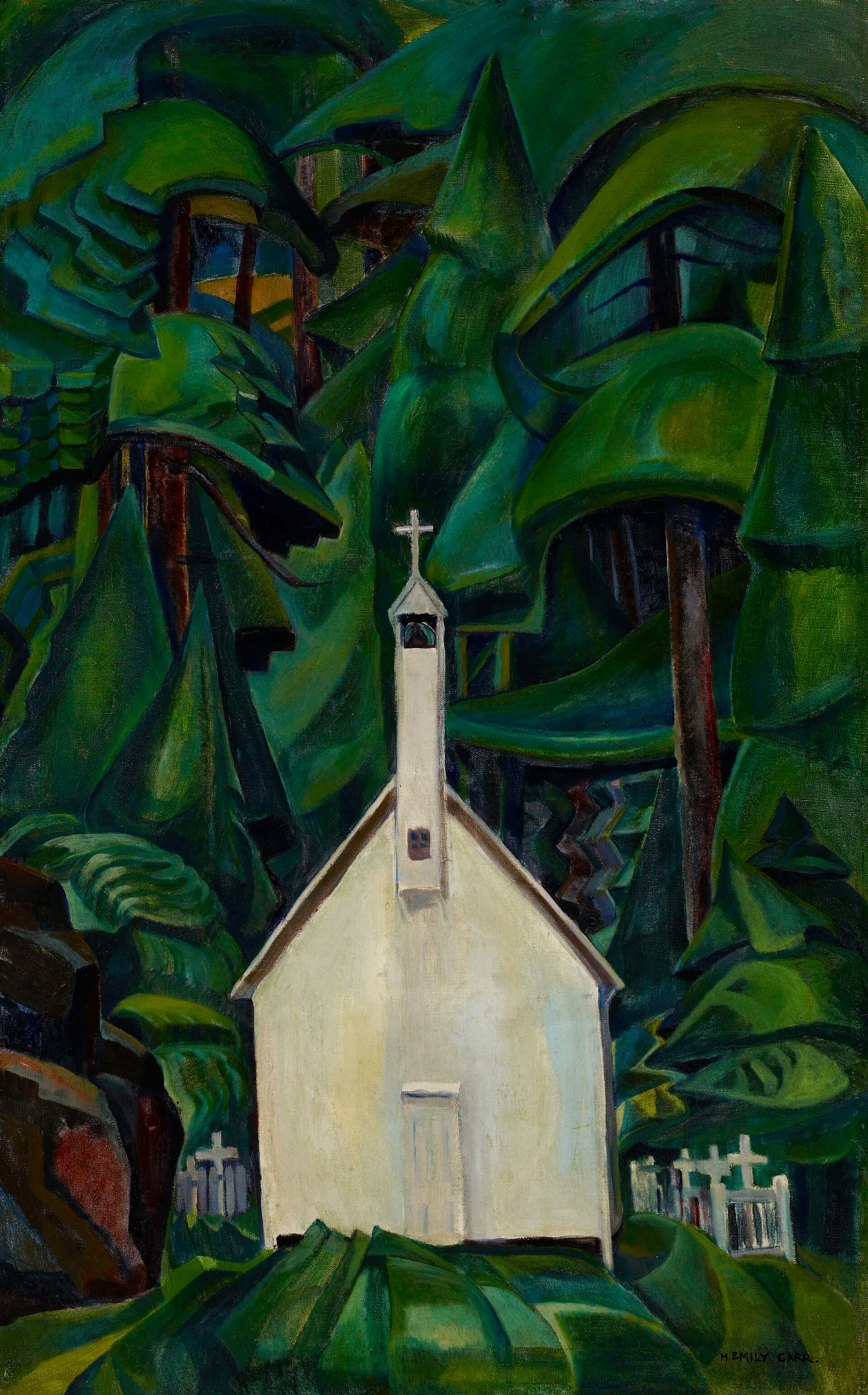
Church at Yuquot Village by Emily Carr (1929)

The earliest known visual art produced in the Pacific Northwest, and what would become British Columbia, was by First Nations such as the Coast Salish, Haida, Heiltsuk, and Tsimshian, among others. Such Indigenous work comes particularly in the form of woodcarving, as seen in totem poles, transformation masks, and canoes, as well as textile arts like Chilkat weaving and button blankets. Traditional Indigenous art of the Pacific Northwest is typically distinguished by the formline style, which is defined as "continuous, flowing, curvilinear lines that turn, swell and diminish in a prescribed manner. They are used for figure outlines, internal design elements and in abstract compositions."

Western styles and forms were introduced to the region through the establishment of British North American settlements in the late 18th century. Notable English-Canadian artists of 19th and early 20th century British Columbia include architect Francis Rattenbury, designer James Blomfield, and painter Emily Carr.

Vancouver's art scene was dominated by lyrical abstraction and surrealist landscape painting in the mid-20th century through such artists as B. C. Binning, Jack Shadbolt, Gordon A. Smith, Takao Tanabe, Don Jarvis, and Toni Onley. In the following decades, the city would undergo more artistic diversification with the emergence of conceptual art, communication art, video art, and performance art.

The Vancouver School of conceptual photography encompasses a cohort of Vancouver-based artists who gained notoriety in the 1980s. This school is generally considered to include artists Jeff Wall, Ian Wallace, Ken Lum, Roy Arden, Stan Douglas, and Rodney Graham.

Vancouver maintains roughly 350 works of outdoor public art. Some notable works include A-maze-ing Laughter, Digital Orca, Girl in a Wetsuit, Angel of Victory, The Birds, and the Brockton Point totem poles.

=== Performing arts ===
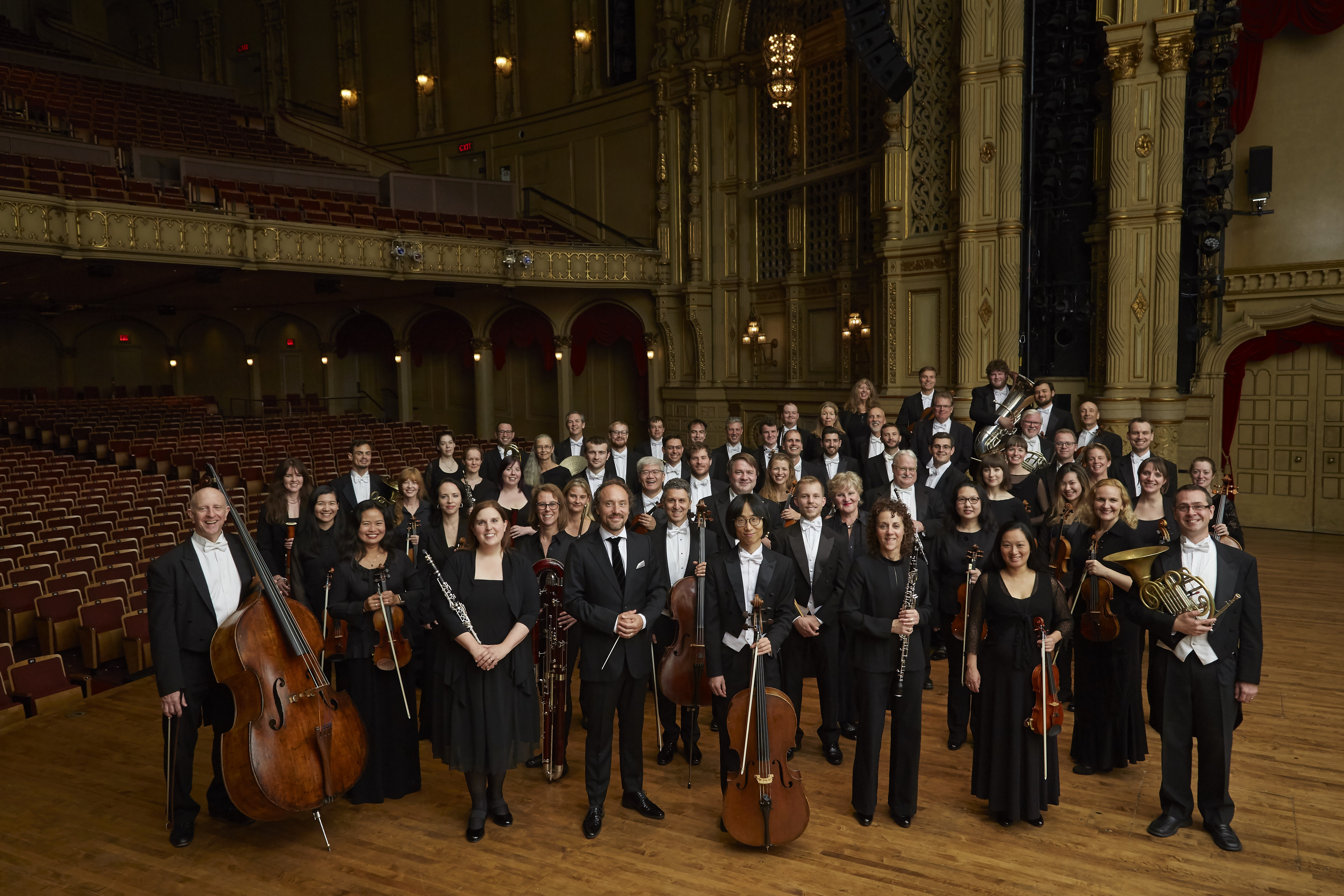
The Vancouver Symphony Orchestra at the Orpheum concert hall, 2019

British Columbia is home to several major performing arts companies, including the Vancouver Opera and Ballet BC. The province also hosts a diverse range of contemporary dance companies, such as Kidd Pivot, Holy Body Tattoo, and the butoh troupe Kokoro Dance.

Independent theatre companies include the Arts Club Theatre Company, Bard on the Beach, and Theatre Under the Stars. Major performing arts venues include the Queen Elizabeth Theatre, the Orpheum Theatre, and the Royal Theatre in Victoria.

==== Music ====
British Columbia is the third largest music-producing province in Canada and the local music industry generates an estimated yearly revenue of $265 million. The province is home to the Vancouver Symphony Orchestra, the Okanagan Symphony Orchestra, the Vancouver Metropolitan Orchestra, the Vancouver Youth Symphony Orchestra, the Richmond Delta Youth Orchestra, and the Victoria Symphony.

Some important popular music acts include bands such as Spirit of the West, Theory of a Deadman, Trooper, Gob, and The New Pornographers, and solo artists such as Bryan Adams, Carly Rae Jepsen, Mac DeMarco, Michael Bublé, Nelly Furtado, and Diana Krall. Music festivals in BC have included the Squamish Valley Music Festival, Shambhala Music Festival, and Pemberton Music Festival.

=== Cuisine ===
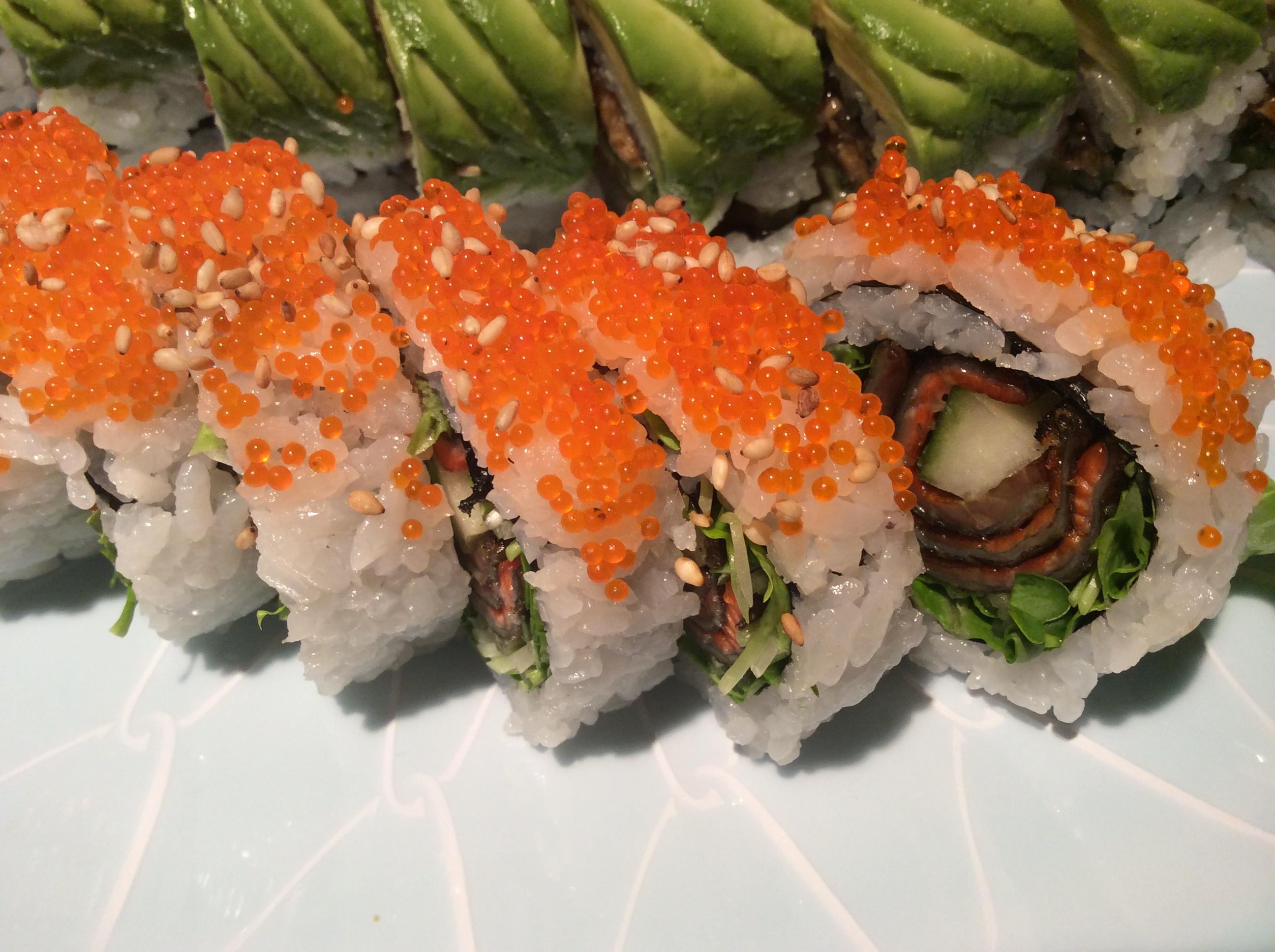
The BC roll is a kind of sushi containing barbecued salmon and cucumber

British Columbian cuisine is commonly associated with healthy living, fusion, fresh local ingredients, and innovation. It can be divided into two broadly-defined traditions: cuisine associated with the west coast, which incorporates a variety of seafood elements, and cuisine associated with the interior of the province, which embraces local game meat, farm-to-table produce, and methods of curing and smoking. Seafood is an important staple of the province's local food culture due to its proximity to the Pacific Ocean, as well as the region's numerous rivers and lakes. BC is known for several unique dishes and is a producer of fruit, wine, and cheese.

Seafoods of British Columbia include sushi (BC roll, dynamite roll, California roll), dungeness crab (boiled, tacos), spot prawns, wild pacific salmon (smoked, candied, teriyaki, chowder, sandwich), and halibut (baked, lemon ginger), as well as delicacies like white sturgeon caviar and geoduck.

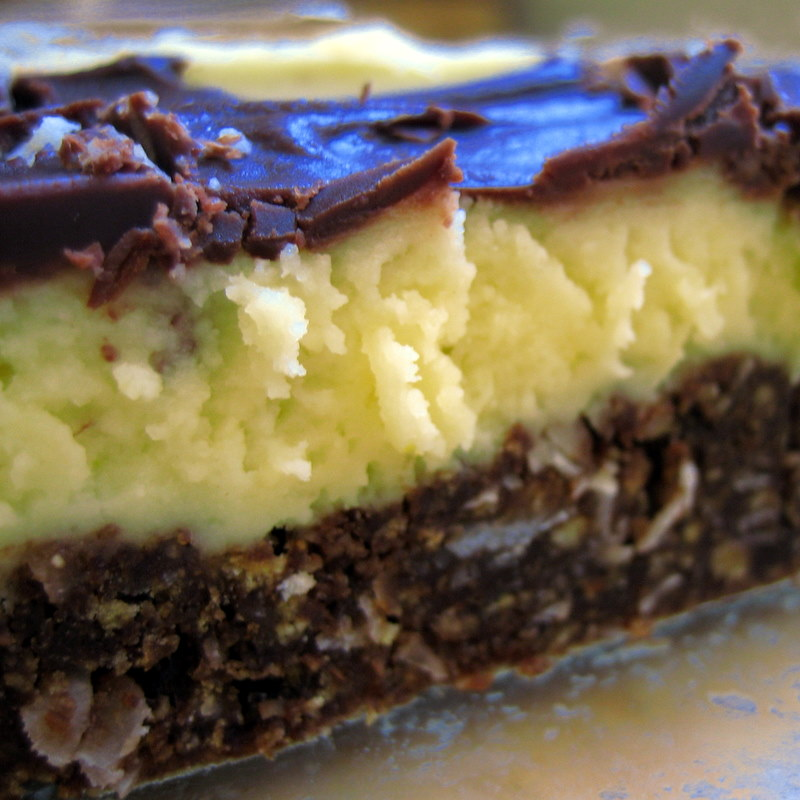
Nanaimo bars originate from the city of Nanaimo and consist of a crumb and nut base, custard middle, and ganache top layer

British Columbia is also home to numerous unique non-seafood culinary staples. Some dishes include borscht, Salt Spring Island lamb, Japadog street food, and Butter chicken pizza. Some unique pastries include apple cranberry cinnamon buns, Nanaimo bars, and Victoria creams. British Columbia also produces several distinct local cheeses, such as kabritt, Castle Blue, and Comox Brie. The London Fog tea latte was invented in Vancouver and remains a popular beverage among coffee shops in the Pacific Northwest and Western Canada; it is referred to as a "Vancouver Fog" in Scotland.

The Okanagan produces many unique fruits originating from the region, including Ambrosia and Spartan apples, Stella and Skeena cherries, and Corontation grapes. Other fruits grown in the province include peaches, pears, plums, apricots, strawberries, blackberries, cranberries, and loganberries.

British Columbia is renowned for its wine production. The primary wine-producing regions include the Okanagan, the Similkameen Valley, Vancouver Island, the Gulf Islands, and the Fraser Valley. As of November 2014, there are 280 licensed grape wineries and 929 vineyards.

== Outdoor life and athletics ==
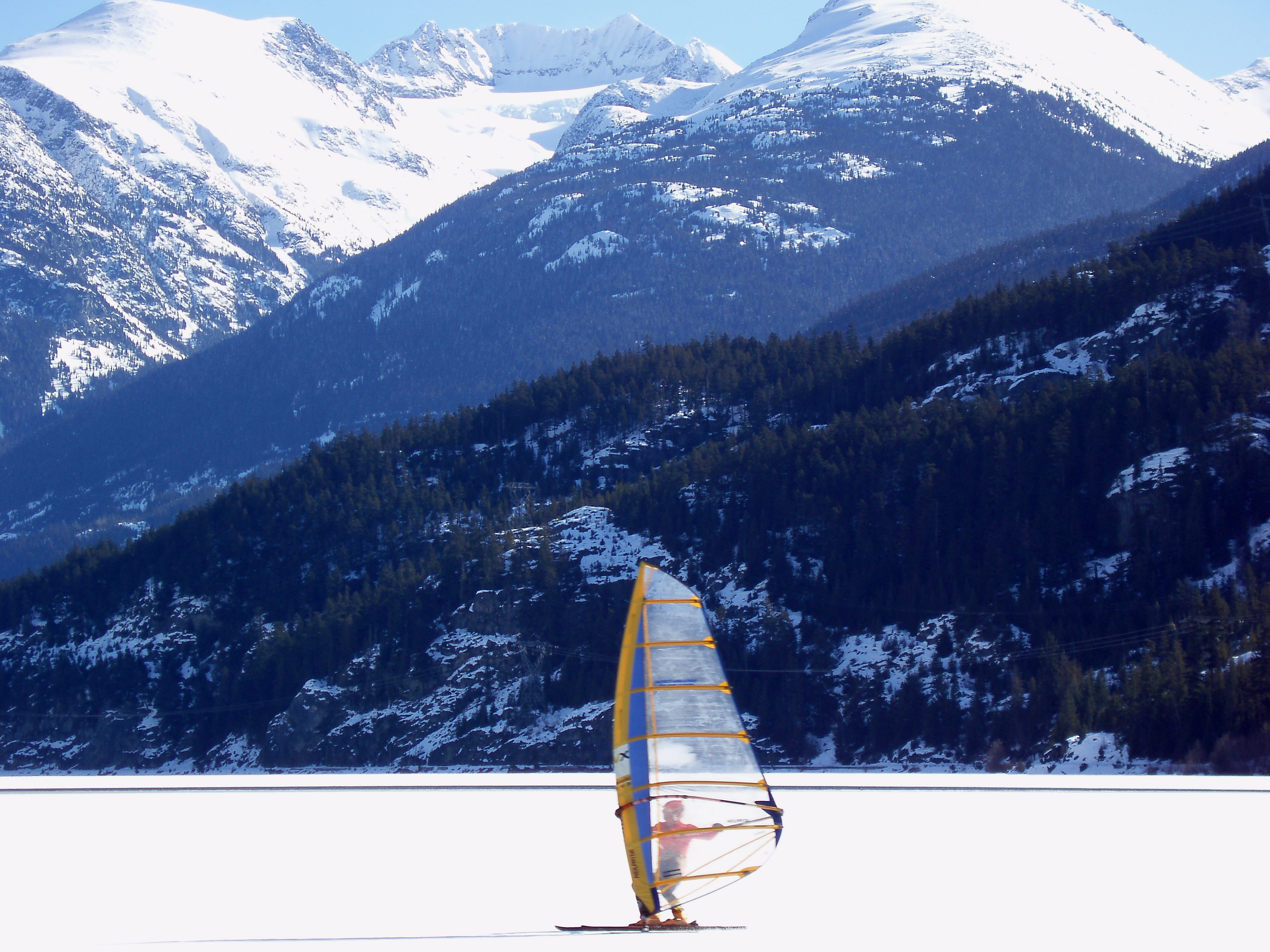
Ice sailing in Whistler

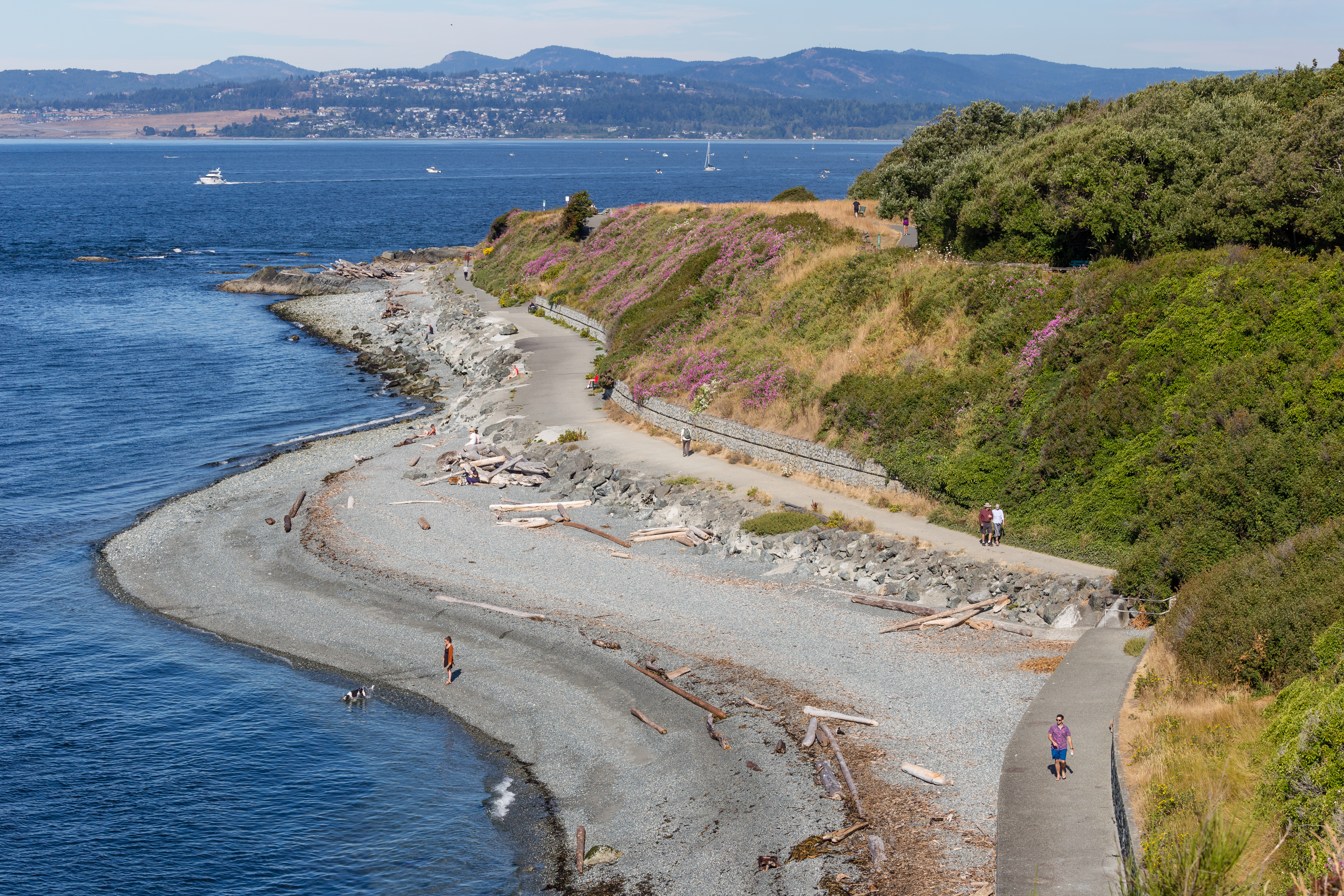
Shoreline Trail in Victoria

Given its varied mountainous terrain and its coasts, lakes, rivers, and forests, British Columbia has long been enjoyed for pursuits like hiking and camping, rock climbing and mountaineering, hunting and fishing.

Water sports, both motorized and non-motorized, are enjoyed in many places. Sea kayaking opportunities abound on the British Columbia coast with its fjords. Whitewater rafting and kayaking are popular on many inland rivers. Sailing and sailboarding are widely enjoyed.

In winter, cross-country and telemark skiing are much enjoyed, and in recent decades high-quality downhill skiing has been developed in the Coast Mountain range and the Rockies, as well as in the southern areas of the Shuswap Highlands and the Columbia Mountains. Snowboarding has mushroomed in popularity since the early 1990s. The 2010 Winter Olympics downhill events were held in the Whistler Blackcomb area of the province, while the indoor events were conducted in the Vancouver area.

In Vancouver, Victoria and some other cities, opportunities for joggers and bicyclists have been developed. Cross-country bike touring has been popular since the ten-speed bike became available many years ago. Since the advent of the more robust mountain bike, trails in more rugged and wild places have been developed for them. A 2016 poll on global biking website Pinkbike rated BC as the top destination mountain bikers would like to ride. Some of the province's retired rail beds have been converted and maintained for hiking, biking, and cross-country skiing. Longboarding is also a popular activity because of the hilly geography of the region.

In certain areas, there are businesses, non-profit societies, or municipal governments dedicated to promoting ecotourism in their region. A number of British Columbia farmers offer visitors to combine tourism with farm work, for example, through the WWOOF Canada program.

=== Sports ===
List of sport teams in British Columbia
Team	City	League	Stadium/arena
Abbotsford Canucks	Abbotsford	American Hockey League	Abbotsford Centre
BC Lions	Vancouver	Canadian Football League	BC Place
BC Thunder	Richmond	National Ringette League	Richmond Ice Centre
Kamloops Blazers	Kamloops	Canadian Hockey League	Sandman Centre
Kelowna Rockets	Kelowna	Canadian Hockey League	Prospera Place
Pacific FC	Langford	Canadian Premier League	Starlight Stadium
Prince George Cougars	Prince George	Canadian Hockey League	CN Centre
Vancouver Bandits	Langley	Canadian Elite Basketball League	Langley Events Centre
Vancouver Canucks	Vancouver	National Hockey League	Rogers Arena
Vancouver FC	Langley	Canadian Premier League	Willoughby Stadium
Vancouver Giants	Langley	Canadian Hockey League	Langley Events Centre
Vancouver Warriors	Vancouver	National Lacrosse League	Rogers Arena
Vancouver Whitecaps	Vancouver	Major League Soccer	BC Place
Victoria Royals	Victoria	Canadian Hockey League	Save-On-Foods Memorial Centre

== Education ==
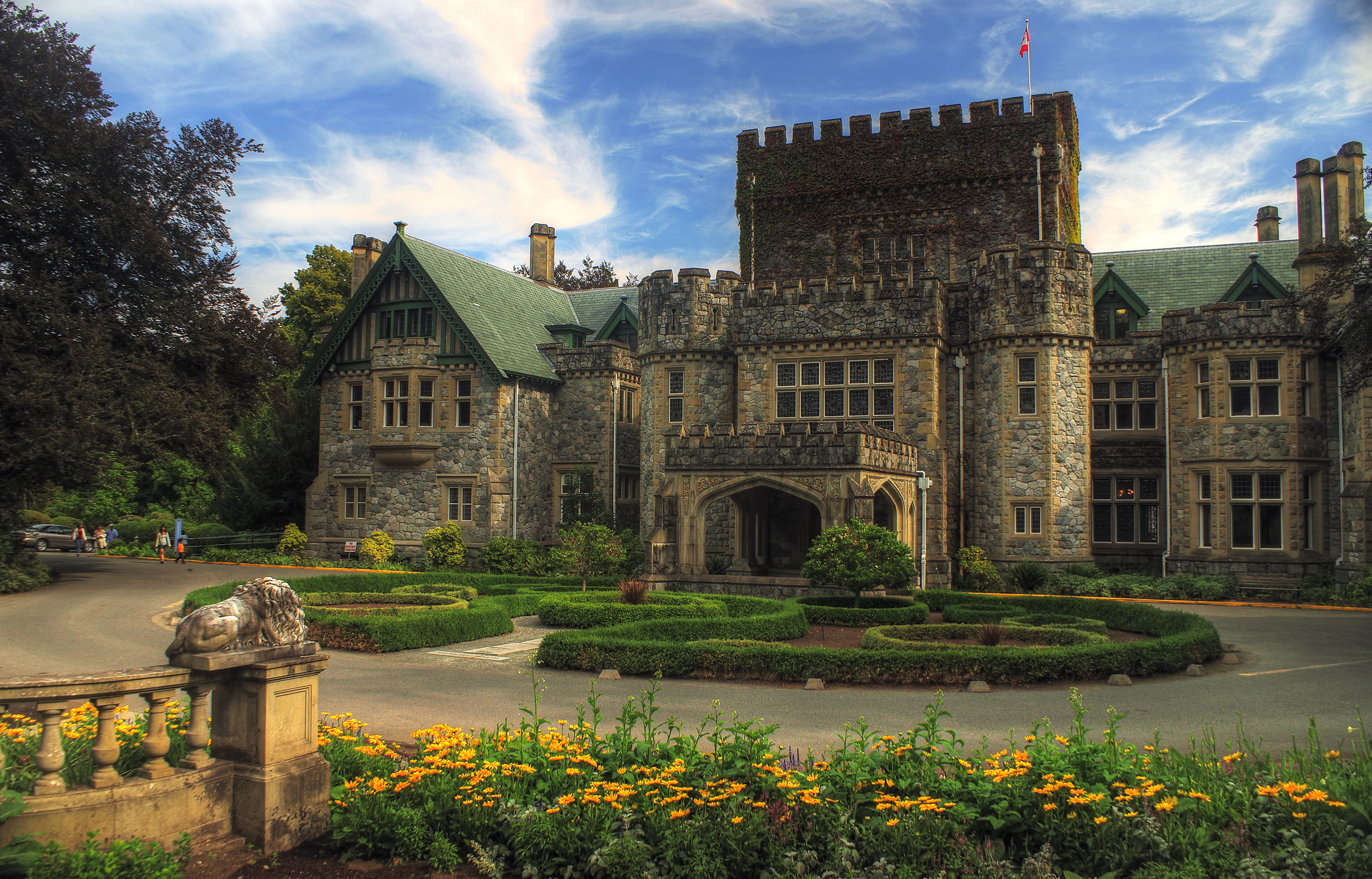
Hatley Castle on the campus of Royal Roads University

=== K-12 education ===
British Columbia is home to a comprehensive education system consisting of public schools and independent schools, overseen by the provincial Ministry of Education. The public school system has 59 anglophone school districts and one francophone school district, the Conseil scolaire francophone de la Colombie-Britannique, which operates French-language public schools throughout the province. The anglophone school districts are governed by school board trustees who are directly elected by the school district's residents.

86 percent of students are enrolled in the public school system. British Columbia has one of the highest shares of independent school enrolment among Canadian provinces, at 14 percent of the student population, due to its relatively generous funding model; most independent schools receive 50 percent of the operating funding that their public counterparts receive from the government. Less than 1 percent of students are home schooled.

Like most other provinces in Canada, education is compulsory from ages 6 to 16 (grades 1–10). The vast majority of students remain in school until they graduate from high school (grade 12) at the age of 18. In order to graduate with a graduation certificate, known as a Dogwood Diploma in BC, students must take a minimum of 80 course credits during grades 10 to 12. These credits include a variety of required courses (e.g. in language arts, social studies, mathematics, and science), as well as elective courses.

Academic achievement in British Columbia is relatively good, although it has been slipping in recent years by some measures. In 2020, 86 percent of students in British Columbia graduated from high school within six years of entering grade 8. According to the 2018 Programme for International Student Assessment (PISA) scores, students in British Columbia scored the second highest in reading ability, fourth highest in mathematic prowess, and fourth highest in science knowledge of the 10 Canadian provinces, although these scores have declined significantly since the 2000 and 2015 assessments.

==== International students ====
In September 2014, there were 11,000 international students in BC public K-12 schools and about 3,000 international students in other BC K-12 schools.

Simon Fraser University in Burnaby

=== Higher education ===
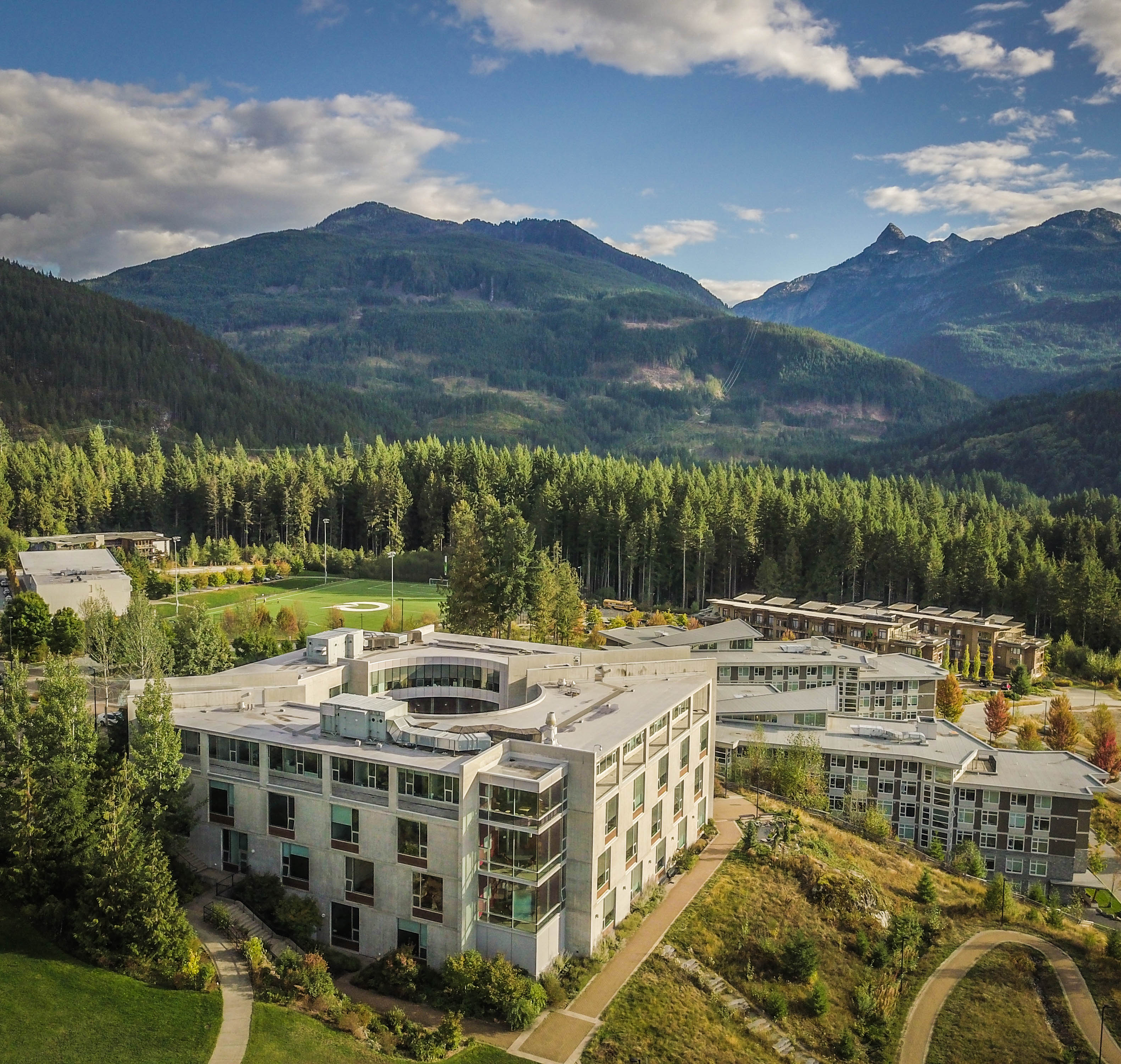
A Quest University Canada Academic Building

British Columbia has a diverse array of higher educational institutions, ranging from publicly funded universities, colleges, and institutes, to private universities, colleges, seminaries, and career institutes. Public institutions receive approximately half of their funding from grants from the provincial government, with the remaining revenue stemming from tuition charges and philanthropic donations. Each post-secondary institution sets its own admission requirements, although the standard requirement is the completion of high school.

Public universities and colleges include:

- University of British Columbia
- Simon Fraser University
- University of Victoria
- University of Northern British Columbia
- Vancouver Island University
- British Columbia Institute of Technology
- Kwantlen Polytechnic University
- Thompson Rivers University
- Emily Carr University of Art and Design
- Royal Roads University
- Capilano University
- University of the Fraser Valley
- Douglas College
- Camosun College
- Langara College
- Selkirk College
- College of New Caledonia
- College of the Rockies
- Okanagan College
- Coast Mountain College
- Justice Institute of BC

British Columbia is home to 11 private colleges and universities located throughout the province, including:

- Quest University
- Trinity Western University
- Alexander College
- University Canada West
- Columbia College
- Coquitlam College
- Ashton College
- Blanche Macdonald
- Vanwest College

Two American universities (Fairleigh Dickinson University and Northeastern University) also have degree-granting campuses in Vancouver.

== See also ==
- Index of British Columbia–related articles
- Outline of British Columbia
- Symbols of British Columbia
