= List of regions in Canada =

The list of regions in Canada is a summary of geographical areas on a hierarchy that ranges from national (groups of provinces and territories) at the top to local regions and sub-regions of provinces at the bottom. Administrative regions that rank below a province and above a municipality are also included if they have a comprehensive range of functions compared to the limited functions of specialized government agencies. Some provinces and groups of provinces are also quasi-administrative regions at the federal level for purposes such as representation in the Senate of Canada. However regional municipalities (or regional districts in British Columbia) are included with local municipalities in the article list of municipalities in Canada.

== National regions ==
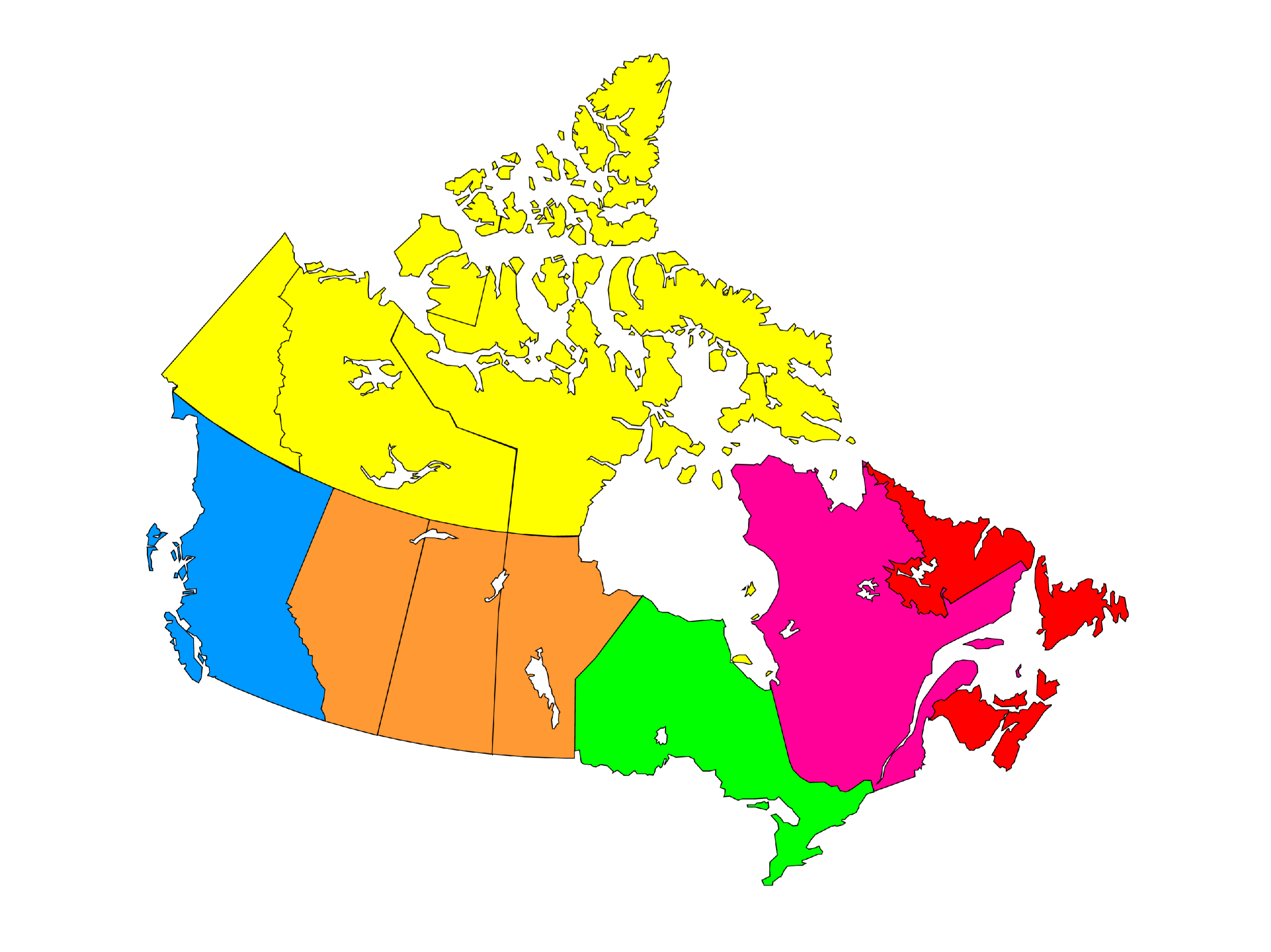
The six geographical regions of Canada defined by Statistics Canada: Atlantic Quebec Ontario Prairies British Columbia Territories

The provinces and territories are sometimes grouped into regions, listed here from west to east by province, followed by the three territories. Seats in the Senate are equally divided among four regions: Western Canada, Ontario, Quebec, and the Maritimes, with special status for Newfoundland and Labrador as well as for the three territories of Northern Canada ('the North'). This is the only regional scheme that has any legal status or function.

Regional representation on the Supreme Court of Canada is governed more by convention than by law. Quebec is the only region with a legally guaranteed quota of three judges on the bench. The other regions are usually represented by three judges from Ontario, two from Western Canada (typically but not formally one from British Columbia and one from the Prairie Provinces) and one from Atlantic Canada. The three territories do not have any separate representation on the Supreme Court.

Statistics Canada uses the six-region model for the Geographical Regions of Canada. Immigration, Refugees and Citizenship Canada uses the five-region model, while seven regions are commonly used for polling.

The various models are derived from the three-region scheme by progressively subdividing the western and eastern regions (the northern region is the same for all models) into smaller and smaller units consisting of provinces or groups of provinces. If the models are not treated as mutually exclusive, eight distinct national regions can be identified when the three western regions of the seven region scheme are combined with the two Atlantic regions of the Senate method and the Ontario, Quebec, and northern regions common to both schemes.

All provinces and territories	Senate divisions	Seven-region model (Note: Used, for example, by Ekos Research Associates and Decima Research)	Six-region model	Five-region model	Four-region model	Three-region model	Two-region model
Yukon	The North (3 seats)	Northern Canada	Territories	The North	Northern Canada	Northern Canada	Northern / Western Canada
Northwest Territories	The North (3 seats)	Northern Canada	Territories	The North	Northern Canada	Northern Canada	Northern / Western Canada
Nunavut	The North (3 seats)	Northern Canada	Territories	The North	Northern Canada	Northern Canada	Northern / Western Canada
British Columbia	Western Canada (24 seats)	British Columbia	British Columbia	The West Coast	Western Canada	Western Canada	Northern / Western Canada
Alberta	Western Canada (24 seats)	Alberta	Prairies	Prairie Provinces	Western Canada	Western Canada	Northern / Western Canada
Saskatchewan	Western Canada (24 seats)	Saskatchewan and Manitoba	Prairies	Prairie Provinces	Western Canada	Western Canada	Northern / Western Canada
Manitoba	Western Canada (24 seats)	Saskatchewan and Manitoba	Prairies	Prairie Provinces	Western Canada	Western Canada	Northern / Western Canada
Ontario	Ontario (24 seats)	Ontario	Ontario	Central Canada	Central Canada	Eastern Canada	Eastern Canada
Quebec	Quebec (24 seats)	Quebec	Quebec	Central Canada	Central Canada	Eastern Canada	Eastern Canada
New Brunswick	The Maritimes (24 seats)	Atlantic Canada	Atlantic	Atlantic Provinces	Atlantic Canada	Eastern Canada	Eastern Canada
Prince Edward Island	The Maritimes (24 seats)	Atlantic Canada	Atlantic	Atlantic Provinces	Atlantic Canada	Eastern Canada	Eastern Canada
Nova Scotia	The Maritimes (24 seats)	Atlantic Canada	Atlantic	Atlantic Provinces	Atlantic Canada	Eastern Canada	Eastern Canada
Newfoundland and Labrador	Newfoundland and Labrador (6 seats)	Atlantic Canada	Atlantic	Atlantic Provinces	Atlantic Canada	Eastern Canada	Eastern Canada

== Inter-provincial regions ==
As of 5 June 2026, approximately 98.2% of Canadians can speak English, French, or both: English – 69.0% English and French – 18.0% French – 11.2% Sparsely populated area 0.4 inhabitants per square kilometre (1.0 inhabitant per square mile)

An inter-provincial region includes more than one province or territory but does not usually include the entirety of each province or territory in the group. However, the geographic or cultural features that characterize this type of region can sometimes lead to the relevant provinces or territories being seen as regional groups like British Columbia-Yukon and Alberta-Northwest Territories.

=== Linguistic ===
- French Canada, centred in Quebec but with scattered populations in Manitoba, Ontario, and the Maritimes that are increasingly part of...
- The Bilingual Belt, a portion of Canada where both English and French are regularly spoken: Northeastern Ontario, Southeastern Ontario, the Ottawa Valley, the Island of Montreal, the Eastern Townships of Quebec and northern and eastern New Brunswick
- English Canada, sometimes known as the Rest of Canada, with Quebec usually excluded despite the presence of scattered English speaking populations in the southern part of the province which are increasingly part of the bilingual belt
- Inuit Nunangat, a large region of northern Canada stretching from Labrador (Nunatsiavut), through Quebec (Nunavik), Nunavut, and the Inuvialuit Settlement Region (Northwest Territories and Yukon Populated mainly by Inuit (48,690 people), the majority of whom do not claim either English or French as their first language

=== Primary, secondary, and local geographic ===
- Arctic Archipelago, a large group of Canadian islands in the Arctic Ocean that lies partly in Nunavut, partly in the Northwest Territories, and one, Herschel Island, that is part of Yukon.
  - Arctic Cordillera, a very long, broken chain of mountain ranges extending along the northeastern flank of the Arctic Archipelago from Ellesmere Island to the northernmost part of the Labrador Peninsula in northern Labrador and northern Quebec
- Canadian Cordillera which links most of British Columbia and Yukon with some smaller adjacent areas of Alberta and the Northwest Territories to form a single region of mountains and plateaus
  - Taiga Cordillera that includes much of northern Yukon and an adjacent area of the Northwest Territories
  - Boreal Cordillera that links northwestern British Columbia with southern Yukon
  - Pacific Maritime Ecozone that includes the west coast of British Columbia and the southwest corner of Yukon
  - Montane Cordillera that includes the central and southern interior of British Columbia and the Rocky Mountains that extend partly into Alberta
- Interior Plains of western Canada, which extend from the coast of the Arctic Ocean to the Canada–United States border east of the Canadian Cordillera and west of the Canadian Shield; links the Mackenzie River valley with the Canadian Prairies.
  - Southern Arctic Ecozone that includes the Arctic coast of Yukon, the Northwest Territories, and an adjacent part of Nunavut
  - Taiga Plains Ecozone that include parts of northeastern Yukon, the Northwest Territories, northeastern British Columbia, and northwestern Alberta
  - Boreal Plains Ecozone, which links parts of northern British Columbia, Alberta, and Saskatchewan with part of central Manitoba and a small part of the Northwest Territories
    - Peace River Country, a valley area of parkland and boreal plain that links parts of northern British Columbia and northern Alberta as a part of the larger Boreal Plains region
  - Aspen parkland, a long but relatively narrow transitional region in the Prairie Provinces that separates the boreal forests of the north from the prairie grasslands further south
  - The Prairies, including the grasslands and the Palliser's Triangle that links the main agricultural regions of Alberta, Saskatchewan and Manitoba
    - Cypress Hills that links the hilly areas of southern Alberta with their counterparts in southern Saskatchewan
- Canadian Shield, a vast region centred around Hudson Bay that includes parts of every province except British Columbia and the Maritimes, and parts of every territory except Yukon
  - Northern Arctic Shield, includes the Boothia and Melville Peninsulas of Nunavut and the northwestern tip of Quebec.
  - Southern Arctic Shield, parts of the Canadian Shield separated by Hudson Bay and located mostly in Nunavut and the most northerly region of Quebec
  - Taiga Shield, parts of the Canadian Shield located west of Hudson Bay from the Northwest Territories to the far northern fringe of the Prairie Provinces, and east of Hudson Bay and James Bay from Quebec to Labrador
  - Boreal Shield, located mostly south of Hudson Bay and James Bay from northeastern Alberta to southeastern Labrador
  - Southern Boreal Shield, a transitional region in Central Ontario and the west-central part of Quebec that separates the boreal forests of the north from the mostly mixed-leaf forests further south
- Hudson Bay Lowlands, a large wetland that extends from northeastern Manitoba across the far north of Ontario into northwestern Quebec
- Great Lakes–St. Lawrence Lowlands, a low lying region that comprises a section of Southern Ontario and extends along the St. Lawrence River to the Strait of Belle Isle and the Atlantic Ocean
  - Quebec City–Windsor Corridor that links Southern Ontario with Southern Quebec
  - Ottawa Valley that links Eastern Ontario with western Quebec, the southern part of which overlaps the Quebec City–Windsor Corridor and the Mixedwood Plains
- Appalachian Uplands, an old, partly eroded system of mountain ranges, hills, and plateaus that extends into southeastern Canada from the eastern United States
  - Acadia, a largely historical region that links parts of the Maritimes and parts of eastern Quebec within the Appalachian region

=== Administrative ===
- National Capital Region, a federal administrative region that straddles the Ottawa River on the Ontario-Quebec border and includes the cities of Ottawa and Gatineau.

== Provincial regions ==
The provinces and territories are nearly all sub-divided into regions for a variety of official and unofficial purposes. The geographic regions are largely unofficial and therefore somewhat open to interpretation. In some cases, the primary regions are separated by identifiable transition zones, particularly in Alberta, Saskatchewan, and Ontario. The largest provinces can be divided into a number of primary geographic regions of comparatively large size (e.g. southern Ontario), and subdivided into a greater number of smaller secondary regions (e.g. southwestern Ontario). The primary and secondary regions in Ontario are mainly non-administrative in nature. However, they tend to be defined as geographic groupings of counties, regional municipalities, and territorial districts, so that the regions are defined by a system or collection of borders that have local administrative importance.

In other large provinces, the primary and secondary geographic regions are defined more strictly by topographical and ecological boundaries. In geographically diverse provinces, the secondary regions can be further subdivided into numerous local regions and even sub-regions. British Columbia has a much greater number of local regions and sub-regions than the other provinces and territories due to its mountainous terrain where almost every populated lake, sound, and river valley, and every populated cape and cluster of small islands can claim a distinct geographical identity. At the other extreme, Prince Edward Island is not divided into any widely recognized geographic regions or sub-regions because of its very small size and lack of large rivers or rugged terrain. New Brunswick's small size renders it dividable into local geographic regions only.

Several provinces and territories also have supra-municipal administrative regions. Their borders mostly do not harmonize with the geographic regions, so they are not considered subdivisions or groupings of the latter.

=== Alberta ===
==== Primary, secondary, and local geographic regions ====
- Northern Alberta (forests that lie mostly north of the North Saskatchewan River)
  - Alberta Taiga Plains
  - Alberta Taiga Shield
  - Alberta Boreal Plain
    - Peace River Country (Alberta portion)
  - Alberta Boreal Shield
- Alberta Mountain forests
- Southern Alberta (geographic)
  - Alberta Parkland
  - Alberta Prairie
  - Cypress Hills (Alberta portion)

==== Quasi-administrative or demographic regions ====
These regions are not officially considered subdivisions of the larger primary natural regions.

- Northern Alberta
- Central Alberta
  - Calgary–Edmonton Corridor
- Southern Alberta
- Alberta's Rockies
- Calgary Metropolitan Region
- Edmonton Metropolitan Region

=== British Columbia ===
==== Primary, secondary, and local geographic regions and subregions ====
- British Columbia Interior
  - North Interior Taiga Plains
  - North Interior Boreal Plains/Peace River Country
  - North Interior Boreal Cordillera
    - Atlin District
    - Stikine Country
  - Central Interior Montane Cordillera
    - Nechako
    - Bulkley
    - Omineca–Prince George
    - Robson Valley
    - Cariboo
      - Interlakes
      - Fraser Canyon
    - Chilcotin
  - South Interior Montane Cordillera
    - Kootenays
      - West Kootenay
        - Kootenay Lake
        - Slocan
        - Arrow Lakes
      - East Kootenay
        - Elk Valley
        - Columbia Valley
      - Columbia Country
        - Big Bend Country
    - Okanagan
    - Boundary
    - Similkameen
    - Thompson
      - Nicola
      - Bonaparte
      - Wells Gray–Clearwater
    - Shuswap
    - Fraser Canyon (overlaps Lillooet Country)
      - Bridge River Country
- Lower Mainland
  - Greater Vancouver
  - Fraser Valley
- British Columbia Coast/Pacific Maritime Cordillera
  - South Coast
    - Sea-to-Sky Corridor
    - Lillooet Country (overlaps Fraser Canyon region and Sea-to-Sky Corridor)
      - Pemberton Valley
      - Gates Valley
    - Sunshine Coast
  - Central Coast
    - Queen Charlotte Strait
    - Bella Coola Valley
  - North Coast
    - Haida Gwaii (formerly Queen Charlotte Islands)
    - Skeena
    - Nass
    - Stewart Country
- Vancouver Island
  - South Island
    - Greater Victoria
      - Saanich Peninsula
      - Western Communities
      - Juan de Fuca region
    - South Central Island (included with an extended Central Island region for some administrative purposes)
      - Cowichan Valley
      - Chemainus Valley
  - Central Island
    - East Central Island
      - East Central Coast (Ladysmith–Nanaimo–Parksville)
      - Comox Valley
    - West Central Island
      - Nootka Sound
      - Clayoquot Sound
      - Barkley Sound
      - Alberni Valley
  - North Island
    - Northwest Island
      - Kyuquot Sound
      - Quatsino Sound
      - Cape Scott
    - Northeast Island
      - Queen Charlotte Strait
      - Johnstone Strait
  - Gulf Islands
    - Southern Gulf Islands
    - Northern Gulf Islands

=== Manitoba ===
==== Primary and secondary geographic regions ====
- Northern Manitoba (forests mostly north of the Saskatchewan River and east of Lake Winnipeg)
  - Hudson Bay Lowlands (Manitoba portion)
  - Manitoba Taiga Shield
  - Manitoba Boreal Shield.
- Central Manitoba
  - Interlake (Manitoba Boreal Plain)
  - Manitoba Parkland
- Southern Manitoba (eastern part of Palliser's Triangle)
  - Central Plains
  - Eastman
  - Westman
  - Winnipeg Metropolitan Region (administrative)
  - Pembina Valley

=== New Brunswick ===
==== Geographic regions (No distinctions made between primary, secondary, or local) ====
- Acadian Peninsula
- North Shore
- Fundy Isles
- Miramichi Valley
- Saint John Valley
- Greater Shediac
- Greater Moncton
- Greater Saint John
  - Kennebecasis Valley
- Greater Fredericton

=== Newfoundland and Labrador ===
==== Primary, secondary, and local geographic regions ====
- Labrador
  - Labrador Arctic Cordillera
  - Labrador Taiga Shield
    - Labrador West
    - Nunatsiavut
  - Labrador Boreal Shield
- Newfoundland
  - Avalon Peninsula
  - Burin Peninsula
  - Bonavista Peninsula
  - South Coast
  - West Coast
    - Bay of Islands
    - Bay St. George
    - Bay St. George South
    - Port au Port Peninsula
  - Great Northern Peninsula
  - Northeast Coast

=== Northwest Territories ===
==== Primary and secondary geographic regions ====
- Arctic Archipelago (NT portion)
- NT mainland
  - Southern Arctic Plains
  - Mackenzie Mountains
  - Taiga Plains
  - Taiga shield (N.W.T. portion)
  - Boreal Plains

==== Administrative regions ====
Administrative regions of the Northwest Territories.

- Inuvik Region
- Sahtu Region
- Dehcho Region
- North Slave Region
- South Slave Region

==== Indigenous governance regions ====
Indigenous governance regions

- Délįnę District
- Katlʼodeeche Gotʼi Ndee
- Tłegǫ́hłı̨ Administrative Area
- Tłı̨chǫ Ndé

==== Self-government agreements in negotiation regions ====
Self-government agreements in negotiation

- Acho Dene Koe Territory
- Akaitcho Territory
- Colville Lake District
- Dehcho Region
- Fort Good Hope District
- Gwichʼin Settlement Area (Gwich'in Tribal Council)
- Gwichʼin Settlement Area (Nihtat Gwichʼin of Inuvik)
- Inuvialuit Settlement Region
- South Slave Metis Region
- Tulita District

=== Nova Scotia ===
==== Primary, secondary, and local geographic regions ====
- Mainland Nova Scotia
  - South Shore
  - Annapolis Valley
  - Eastern Shore
    - Strait of Canso Area
    - Musquodoboit Valley
  - North Shore
- Cape Breton Island
  - Industrial Cape Breton
  - Cape Breton Highlands

=== Nunavut ===
==== Primary and secondary geographic regions ====
- Arctic Archipelago (Nunavut portion)
  - Arctic Cordillera (Nunavut portion)
- Nunavut Mainland
  - Northern Arctic Shield
  - Southern Arctic Plains
  - Southern Arctic Shield
  - Nunavut Taiga Shield

==== Administrative regions ====
- Kitikmeot Region
- Kivalliq Region
- Qikiqtaaluk Region

=== Ontario ===
==== Primary, secondary, and local geographic regions ====
Most geographic regions in Ontario defined by grouping counties and other administrative units

- Northern Ontario (mostly boreal shield that lies north of the French River)
  - Northwestern Ontario
    - Lake of the Woods area
  - Northeastern Ontario
    - Algoma Country
    - Southeastern Boreal Shield (Northeastern Ontario portion)
  - Hudson Bay Lowlands
  - Southern Ontario
    - The 905
    - Greenbelt
    - Oak Ridges Moraine
  - Central Ontario
    - Southeastern Boreal Shield (Central Ontario portion)
      - Thirty Thousand Islands
      - Georgian Bay
      - Muskoka Lakes area
      - Haliburton Highlands
    - St. Lawrence Lowlands / Mixedwood Plains (Central Ontario portion)
      - Kawartha Lakes
      - Bay of Quinte
      - Prince Edward County
  - Eastern Ontario
    - National Capital Region
    - Bilingual belt
    - Ottawa Valley
    - Southeastern Boreal Shield (Eastern Ontario portion)
      - Rideau Lakes area
      - Thousand Islands
    - St. Lawrence Lowlands / Mixedwood Plains (Eastern Ontario portion)
  - Golden Horseshoe
    - Greater Toronto and Hamilton Area
    - Niagara Peninsula
  - Southwestern Ontario
    - Regional Municipality of Waterloo or Tri-Cities
    - Lambton County
    - Ontario Peninsula
  - Georgian Triangle
    - Bruce Peninsula

==== Quasi-administrative regions ====
- Northern Ontario (territorial districts; a quasi-administrative region that extends south of the French River)
- Greater Golden Horseshoe (a quasi-administrative region that extends beyond the geographic Golden Horseshoe)

=== Prince Edward Island ===
Not subdivided into geographical regions or sub-regions

- Kings County
- Queens County
- Prince County

=== Quebec ===
==== Primary and secondary geographic regions ====
- Northern Quebec
  - Arctic Cordillera (Quebec portion)
  - Northern Arctic Shield (Quebec portion)
  - Southern Arctic Shield (Quebec portion)
  - Quebec Taiga Shield
  - Hudson Bay Lowlands (Quebec portion)
- Quebec Boreal Shield
  - Southeastern Boreal Shield (Quebec portion)
- Southern Quebec
  - St. Lawrence Lowlands North Shore (Quebec portion)
  - St. Lawrence Lowlands South Shore (including Montérégie)
  - Hochelaga Archipelago
  - Anticosti Island
  - Appalachian Mountains (Quebec portion)

==== Administrative regions ====
- Montérégie
- Estrie
- Montreal
- Laval
- Centre-du-Québec
- Chaudière-Appalaches
- Outaouais
- Laurentides
- Lanaudière
- Mauricie
- Capitale-Nationale
- Bas-Saint-Laurent
- Gaspésie–Îles-de-la-Madeleine
- Abitibi-Témiscamingue
- Saguenay–Lac-Saint-Jean
- Côte-Nord (North Shore)
- Nord-du-Québec (Northern Quebec)

=== Saskatchewan ===
==== Primary and secondary geographic regions ====
- Northern Saskatchewan (forests that lie mostly north of the North Saskatchewan River)
  - Saskatchewan Taiga Shield
  - Saskatchewan Boreal Shield
  - Saskatchewan Boreal Plain
- Southern Saskatchewan
  - Saskatchewan Parkland
  - Saskatchewan Prairie Grassland
  - Cypress Hills (Saskatchewan portion)

=== Yukon ===
==== Primary, secondary, and local geographic regions ====
- Northern Yukon
  - Yukon Southern Arctic Coastal Plain
  - Yukon Taiga Cordillera
  - Yukon Taiga Plain
- Southern Yukon
  - Yukon Boreal Cordillera
    - Klondike
    - Southern Lakes
  - Pacific Maritime Cordillera

== See also ==
- Cottage country
- Rural Canada
- Census geographic units of Canada
- Numbered Treaties
