= Climate change in Saskatchewan =

Effects of climate change in the Canadian province

The effects of climate change in the Canadian province of Saskatchewan are being observed in parts of the province. There is evidence of reduction of biomass in Saskatchewan's boreal forests (as with those of other Canadian prairie provinces) that is linked by researchers to drought-related water stress stemming from global warming, most likely caused by greenhouse gas emissions. While studies, as early as 1988 (Williams, et al., 1988) have shown that climate change will affect agriculture, whether the effects can be mitigated through adaptations of cultivars, or crops, is less clear. Resiliency of ecosystems may decline with large changes in temperature. The provincial government has responded to the threat of climate change by introducing a plan to reduce carbon emissions, "The Saskatchewan Energy and Climate Change Plan", in June 2007.

== Species diversity ==
Although the adaptive capacity of local species cannot be assumed to be nil, the impacts of anthropogenic climate change, or global warming, are likely to be too rapid for evolution to allow local adaptation. Species of special concern are the piping plover and lake sturgeon, because they are currently IUCN red-listed species their life cycle is dependent on current hydrological regimes. The effects of climate change are also expected to affect the majority of Saskatchewans habitat types, and therefore, changes to the entire ecology of the province are expected.

== Phenology ==
Climate change is expected to alter the phenology, or timing of lifecycle events, of species worldwide. Environmental cues such as seasonal shifts in temperature and photoperiod influence processes such as germination, spring growth, breeding or flowering season, seed set, metamorphosis, migration, and senescence. Increasing winter and spring temperatures over the last century, particularly in northern latitudes, have resulted in rapid phenological shifts in many species. The magnitude and direction of these shifts are unpredictable and vary with latitude, topography, and the species in question. As phenological responses have a high degree of phenotypic plasticity, observations of species-specific phenological trends can be used as a sensitive and dynamic indicator of climate change effects on biota.

Although little published information is available specifically on phenological responses to climate change in Saskatchewan, these are likely to follow general worldwide and regional trends. One such trend is advanced flowering in early-season plants and delayed flowering in late-season plants, leading to increased risk of reproductive failure due to frost damage from cold snaps. For instance, trembling aspen in Alberta has been shown to have advanced in flowering date by 26 days over the past century. Changes in flowering phenology also have the potential to greatly impact plant-pollinator dynamics. Asynchronies between flower availability and pollinator activity may lead to lower pollination rates and declines in ecologically and economically important insect species. This in turn could impact insectivorous consumers and thus have cascading effects on entire food chains. Other insect species may benefit from warmer temperatures. Increased voltinism and winter survival in many insects has the potential for dramatic population increases in pest species such as foliage-eating Lepidoptera and bark-boring Coleoptera.

Alterations in phenology may have important implications for Saskatchewan agriculture, horticulture, forestry, and traditional First Nations plant uses, as well as large-scale cascading effects on communities and ecosystems. More studies are needed, both species-specific and on interactions between species, to better understand potential future responses of Saskatchewan biota to climate change. Programs such as NatureWatch, established in Canada in 1995, encourage citizen-based ecological monitoring as a method of phenological record-keeping. Such long-term monitoring will help us to better anticipate and adapt to these temporal changes and their resulting consequences.

== Ecozones ==
Saskatchewan is divided into four different terrestrial ecozones including the Taiga Shield, Boreal Shield, Boreal Plains and Prairies. These regions are determined by features such as natural—landforms, soils, water features, vegetation and climate, however with climate change these features are beginning to change.

=== Taiga shield ===
The Taiga Shield is predicted to change in species composition if global warming continues in the future. The permafrost on the taiga has shifted northward by approximately 150 kilometres in the last 50 years due to warmer, wetter summer conditions, and increased snowfall in the winter. Because of this shift, lichens, which commonly dominate the bogs in this area, have been replaced by vegetation generally found in dry mesic lichen woodlands. It is predicted that if warming of this ecozone continues, the abundance of lichens, which is still currently high, will decrease considerably. Not only is species composition within the Taiga Shield expected to change in the future, but its boundaries are anticipated to shift northward onto the tundra as well. It is likely that with this northward shift, the way in which forests form will be altered in that they will become shorter and more aggregated. Deformities of individual trees is also likely to be seen due to wind stress from colonizing the open tundra.

=== Boreal shield and boreal plains ===
According to the Intergovernmental Panel on Climate Change (IPCC), the boreal forest is more sensitive to climate change than either temperate or tropical forests and will be most affected by predicted future warming. Projected changes in both temperature and moisture patterns suggest the boreal ecozones will be subjected to changes in both boundaries and natural disturbance regimes.

Not only is it predicted that the boreal ecozones' boundaries will shift northward with global warming, its range is expected to shrink as well. These changes will likely result in both a loss of biodiversity, and a loss of an economically valuable resource for forestry.

Fire is an extremely important natural disturbance in boreal ecozones that is required for the regeneration of stands. Historical records show an increase in fire frequency and intensity in recent years because of drier conditions, and this trend is predicted to continue into the future with global warming. This change in the fire regime can have impacts on species composition and the overall makeup of the boreal forest.

=== Prairies ===
The general circulation models (GCMs) for Saskatchewan's prairie ecozone predict an extremely arid future, which is similar to conditions seen after the Holocene. From these GCMs it has been inferred that the prairies will be subjected to intense desertification and erosion because periods of drought may last ten or more consecutive years. As well, because of this expected warm, dry climate, plants that exhibit C4 carbon fixation will become more competitive than plants that display C3 carbon fixation, and will likely become dominant in the future. Another implication of global warming for the prairie ecozone is on the Prairie Pothole Region. This is the area of hundreds of depressions in the landscape formed by past glaciation. The region comprises both permanent and semi-permanent wetlands, which may experience changes in water depth, areal extent and length of wet and dry cycles. These changes will not only have implications for vegetation surrounding the wetlands, but for waterfowl and other organisms inhabiting them as well.

== Impacts ==
=== Wetlands and water resources ===
Although Saskatchewan may be globally reduced recognized for its vast expanses of fertile agricultural lands, the Southern portion of the province is situated in the heart of the prairie pothole region (PPR), an area renowned for productive wetlands. Within the PPR, Saskatchewan is estimated to have over 1.5 million wetlands covering over 1.7 million hectares. Saskatchewan wetlands are very dynamic ecosystems, as they include a wide variety of shorebirds, amphibians, reptiles, mammals, invertebrates, and aquatic and terrestrial plants. Also, Saskatchewan provides essential habitat for millions of migrating and nesting waterfowl each year. In fact, the number and diversity of breeding waterfowl are directly dependent on the availability of wetlands found throughout the prairie pothole region. Apart from being a home to wildlife, wetlands provide Saskatchewan residents with valuable ecosystem services, such as water quality improvement, flood control, nutrient cycling and carbon sequestration.

Recent data produced by Regional Climate Models have predicted that the temperature in the prairie pothole region in Saskatchewan will rise between 1.8–4 ˚C by the year 2100. Accompanying the rise in temperature, experts anticipate the prairie pothole region will experience an intensified Hydrologic cycle leading to an increase in the frequency of drought periods and torrential rains. Unfortunately, Saskatchewan wetlands have been identified as particularly vulnerable to these changes in climate, as many wetlands are shallow, and have high evaporation rates.

Inter-annual variation between wet and dry periods in which abundant rainfall is followed by a drought period have been a commonality in Saskatchewan wetlands since their formation nearly 14,000 years ago. However, unprecedented changes in climate expected in the prairies have many experts concerned that Saskatchewan wetland ecosystems will not be able tolerate the heat, and intensified wet/dry cycles., For example, Sorenson et al. (1998) predicted that with a doubling of carbon dioxide, the prairie pothole duck population would be cut in half by the year 2060 due to a loss of wetland habitat. It remains unknown how wetland organisms will respond to oncoming climate change; yet, perhaps the biggest uncertainty is predicting the way Saskatchewan citizens decide to share their water with vulnerable wetland ecosystems. As the climate changes in the province of Saskatchewan, improved attention to water management may be critical to protecting Saskatchewan's fragile wetlands.

Currently, Saskatchewan Environment, SaskWater, and the Saskatchewan Watershed Authority are responsible for water quality management in the province. Climate Change will reduce water resource availability and quality, accordingly these organizations are investigating the circumstances that they will eventually encounter. Increased climate variability indicates that stream flow of all rivers will be smaller in magnitude, with flow rates becoming more unpredictable, especially in rivers with many dams, such as the South Saskatchewan River. This means that reservoir management, especially of Lake Diefenbaker, will become more difficult because baseline data will not be available for the specific climate parameters. Cumulatively, the changes to Saskatchewan's wetlands and water resources will have significant impacts of native flora and fauna.

=== Native species distribution ===
The effects on the distribution of native species in Saskatchewan from climate change are beginning to reveal themselves, and will continue to grow worse if mitigation and adaptation measures are not taken. In Saskatchewan, the driest area is found in the southwest, with the landscape becoming progressively more semi-arid, sub-humid, and humid moving north and east. This is reflected in the natural vegetation gradients of the province (ecoregions). Climate change effects are predicted to shift these vegetation zones, and therefore the species that inhabit them northward. For grasslands this means short-grass prairie will move up from regions in the United States, and the mixed-grass prairie will bear down increasingly on the north. The boreal forest would move somewhat north, but continue to shrink in size because of ill-suited conditions, such as a drier climate. This means permanent losses of forest cover in Saskatchewan.

These changes will have impacts for people in the province that will affect our economy and recreational activities. Hunters and fishermen will see a movement and decline in species. For example, waterfowl populations will continue to decline as wetlands contract and dry up; and boreal forest species like deer, moose, and elk will decline because of a losses in forest cover. People who fish will see the usual shift northward of species, but also extirpations in southern and central regions of the province. This will be especially prominent in small, shallow habitats (ponds, small lakes, marshes). Increased turbidity, salinity, and eutrophication in water habitats will also contribute to declines in fish populations. The forestry and agriculture sectors of our economy will also see changes. The loss of the forest cover in the boreal forest will have a direct and negative effect on the forestry economy.

When addressing climate change effects on the native species in Saskatchewan it is important to encourage management strategies for adaptation on top of mitigation policies. Many people do not want to hear the word adaptation; however at the rate the world is going climate change is inevitable and is happening right now, so we need to come up with approaches to adapt as well.

=== Invasive species ===
With climate change affecting the structure and functions of the ecosystems in Saskatchewan, the populations of invasive species are increasing, escalating the possibility of outcompeting native communities. Evidence of the increasing invasive populations is present in the agricultural sector of western Canada, where 37% of the dominant 30 species of insect herbivores are invasive to the region. As the climate continues to warm, the occurrence of extreme weather events such as floods, will allow gateways for aquatics specimens to branch out from their own confined environments. Risks of Asian carp entering Saskatchewan waters and depleting resources for other species is a growing concern. These climate-driven events could lead to completely transformed ecosystems where invasive species dominate function, resulting in a reduced diversity of native species.

Invasive species are one of the primary threats to biodiversity in an ecosystem. Invasive species have the ability to out-compete native species due to a lack of predators, which permits high individual and population growth rates and high reproductive capacities. The behaviour of species in response to climatic conditions allows prediction of the rate of dispersal of invasive species. As the levels of global trade, transport, tourism and climate change continue to increase the threats to biodiversity is amplified. In the most conservative climate change scenarios, bio-climatic models predict the potential distributions, relative abundances and economic damage of several invasive species such as C.obstrictus, O. melanopus, and P. xylostella to increase in Saskatchewan.

The introduction of invasive species occurs in a four-step process:

1. Introduction stage: climate change facilitates transport through intensity and/ or frequency of extreme events and opens areas for settlement.
2. Colonization stage: climate change increases the success of survival and enables better growth of invasive species in the introduced range
3. Establishment: climate change enables successful reproduction and establishment of invasive species
4. Spread: climate change enhances the competitive ability of established invasive species and extends suitable areas, which might offer new opportunities for introductions.

Climatic models show northward shifts in the ecozones of Saskatchewan, creating more agricultural land. The increased area with favourable climates to host insects will allow for a significant spread of more invasive species. An invasive species that is already damaging crops in Saskatchewan is the cabbage seedpod weevil. This insect is native to Europe and arrived in North America in 1930. The weevil reached Saskatchewan in 2000 only five years after being recorded in Lethbridge, Alberta. The current dispersal rates at current temperatures are 55-km/ year. At this rate, predictions show the weevil spreading right across Canada with detrimental effects on crops.

== Conservation of rare habitats ==
Within Saskatchewan there are areas where unique geography or topography allows for rare or distinctive organisms to thrive. These rare habitats and their species will be facing a great deal of stress as human-driven climate change continues to raise temperatures both world-wide and in Saskatchewan. Within the province, these increases in temperature will cause effects such as changes in wind patterns, an increase in rare weather events, a decrease in water availability and cause a northward shift in the ecozone boundaries. These changes to the natural landscape can have large detrimental effects on the conservation efforts made to protect these rare areas.

Examples of areas within Saskatchewan which are currently conserving rare habitats include Provincial Parks such as the Athabasca Sand Dunes Provincial Park, Cypress Hills Provincial Park, and National Parks such as Grassland National Park. Each of these parks protects areas of land which are unique compared to the dominant landscape of commercial agriculture in Saskatchewan. For example, the Grasslands National Park preserves rare grass communities such as mixed grass prairie and short-grass prairie, as well as the many unique and endemic species, such as the black-tailed prairie dog, that depend on these grasses for ecological community preservation. The reason for the establishment of the park was that over 80% of all previous mixed grass prairie and short-grass prairie has been lost in Saskatchewan due to current agricultural practices, and preservation of these species is vital to ecosystem health and biodiversity.

Preservation of these natural habitats is becoming a challenge with the changing climate. Park boundaries, set out for conservation purposes, may be rendered moot as ecozones shift northwards and as increasing fragmentation of the natural landscape occurs due to these ecozone shifts. Increasing temperatures may increase rates of forest fires, flooding and drought in these rarer habitats where species diversity may be low and therefore susceptible to change. Protected area managers need to examine policies in light of these coming changes, and look at possible mitigation techniques such as buffer zones, flexible boundaries and connective corridors to help mitigate the possible loss of rare and endemic species and landscapes in Saskatchewan.

== Agriculture ==
Agriculture is one of the oldest economic activities since it is the backbone of the food supply and without it the world's population would experience food insecurity. Changes in agricultural supply result from the combination of changes in yields and changes in crop acreage. Changes in crop yields are the result of climate changes and any human mitigating responses such as increasing fertilizer or water use or adoption of new crop varieties, while changes in acreage are affected by producers' expectations concerning changes in relative crop prices and per acre returns.

Agriculture is an economic activity that is highly dependent upon weather and climate in order to produce the food and fibre necessary to sustain human life. Despite technological advances, such as improved varieties, genetically modified organisms, and irrigation systems, weather is still a key factor in agricultural productivity, as well as soil properties and natural communities.

Crop and livestock yields are directly affected by changes in climatic factors such as temperature and precipitation and the frequency and severity of extreme events like droughts, floods, and wind storms. Also, carbon dioxide (CO_{2}) is fundamental for plant production; rising concentrations have the potential to enhance the productivity of agro ecosystems by plants producing fewer stomata, small openings in the leaves through which CO_{2} and water vapour are exchanged with the atmosphere, leading to reduced water usage. A temperature rise extends the growing season and the farmable area; it causes earlier maturity of grains and the opportunity to grow new crops. While the temperature rise is beneficial to the crops, the extra heat also affects weeds. Weeds, pests, and insects tend to get better living conditions under higher temperatures. To further increase risks to good crops, is the potential for poor herbicide performance with increased temperatures, reducing the potential crop yields It has been found that the frequency and severity of wheat stripe rust epidemics on winter wheat varies in direct relationship to climatic variation Climate change models generally predict an increased frequency of extreme weather events, and longer, warmer, drier summer, with greater potential for precipitation in the spring and winter. More spring precipitation could mean enough moisture for germination but it could also mean more frequent floods, and drier summers could mean an increased risk or drought, while warmer summer could allow greater crop diversification including increased production of heat loving crops such as corn, sorghum, and soybeans.

The raising of livestock is also an important agricultural activity, particularly in terms of cattle. Hog production is becoming increasingly important. As well, operations are diversifying with the introduction of buffalo and elk because they are more accustomed to Saskatchewan's climate. The main effects of climate change on livestock from increased temperature and decreased precipitation is distress. Warmer conditions in the summer can lead to stress on livestock since dry pastures, poor hay and feed production and shortages of water all lead to worse conditions. On the other hand, increased temperatures during the winter can reduce cold stress for livestock living outdoors and reduced energy requirement to heat facilities for those living indoors. Increased temperature could have a positive effect on the growth of pastures and provide better feed for livestock, assuming the pastures receive adequate moisture. Warmer conditions in the summer can also suppress appetite, leading to lower weight gains.

== Government plans ==
In June 2007, Saskatchewan introduced a plan to address climate change and further develop its energy sector. Introduced by Premier Lorne Calvert, Industry and Resources Minister Maynard Sonntag and Environment Minister John Nilson, the Saskatchewan Energy and Climate Change Plan aims to stabilize greenhouse gas emissions and sets targets to reduce greenhouse gas emissions by 32 per cent by 2020 and 80 per cent by 2050.

The plan has five components, or "emissions reductions wedges" to these targets. These include:

- Conservation and efficiency measures by industry, business and homeowners;
- Carbon dioxide capture and storage measures in Saskatchewan's oil and gas industry and in the province's electricity sector;
- Increased use of renewable energy, including wind, solar power and hydrogen, and further development of Saskatchewan's ethanol and biodiesel resources;
- Reduction of methane and other emissions in the oil and gas industry, and methane and nitrous oxide emissions in the agriculture industry; and
- Creation of more natural carbon sinks in Saskatchewan's forests and soils.

The Saskatchewan Environmental Society is among those who consider the plan inadequate. The Society points to the scientific consensus which calls for industrialized countries to reduce greenhouse gas (ghg) emissions to 25-40% below 1990 levels by the year 2020. They comment that the government's target is 20% below 2006 levels: "As our emissions have grown so rapidly over the past 20 years, this would still leave our provincial emissions well above 1990 levels. Saskatchewan's emission rise is much greater than that of most countries."

== Effects on reptiles and amphibians ==
Saskatchewan has a variety of reptile and amphibians, including two species of turtles, one species of lizard, nine species of snakes, one species of salamander and six species of frogs. Each of these species represents an important stepping stone in a unique food web, either by acting as a predator or as prey. Reptiles and amphibians act as biological controls for vectors of human diseases, such as mosquitos and ticks. They also serve as critical food sources for native and migrating bird populations throughout the province. To lose this source of biodiversity will affect the health of the respective Saskatchewan ecosystems. However, the majority of the populations of these species are already at risk due to other anthropogenic factors, such as pollution and habitat destruction. Climate change may exacerbate the already tenuous positions these species hold in their respective ecosystems.

Concrete examples of risks posed to reptile and amphibian populations in Saskatchewan have been poorly studied, yet many examples exist around the world of the consequences on these fragile organisms from around the world. Desertification of wetland habitats as a result of changing precipitation patterns will decrease the amount of suitable breeding habitat, decreasing populations of amphibians and water dependent reptiles. Such a desertification effect is currently being demonstrated in certain regions of China.

Changes in air temperatures (particularly night temperatures) may affect the metamorphosis rates and reproductive patterns of certain reptile or amphibian species as well. As exemplified in side-blotched lizards (genus Uta) in the United States a nighttime temperature increases raises the rate at which these species may reproduce. This may seem like a positive effect for many shrinking populations, however as habitat sizes continue to decrease, requirements for survival such as food availability may dwindle to the point where larger populations would not survive. Therefore, an effect such as increased reproduction in certain species, may have an overall negative effect on the survival of that species in the wild.

A significant threat to amphibian populations in the wild has been the appearance and spread of a Chytrid Fungus (specifically, Batrachochytrium dendrobatidis), and an increase in global climate temperatures may facilitate a movement of the fungus northward, thus affecting Canada's species of amphibians.

Better monitoring of populations of reptiles and amphibians throughout Saskatchewan would enable better understanding of the roles various species play in food webs.

== See also ==
- Scientific opinion on climate change
- Climate change mitigation
- Temperature record of the past 1000 years
- Plug-in electric vehicles in Saskatchewan
