= Atlantic Maritime Ecozone =

Ecosystem in eastern Canada

Atlantic Maritime
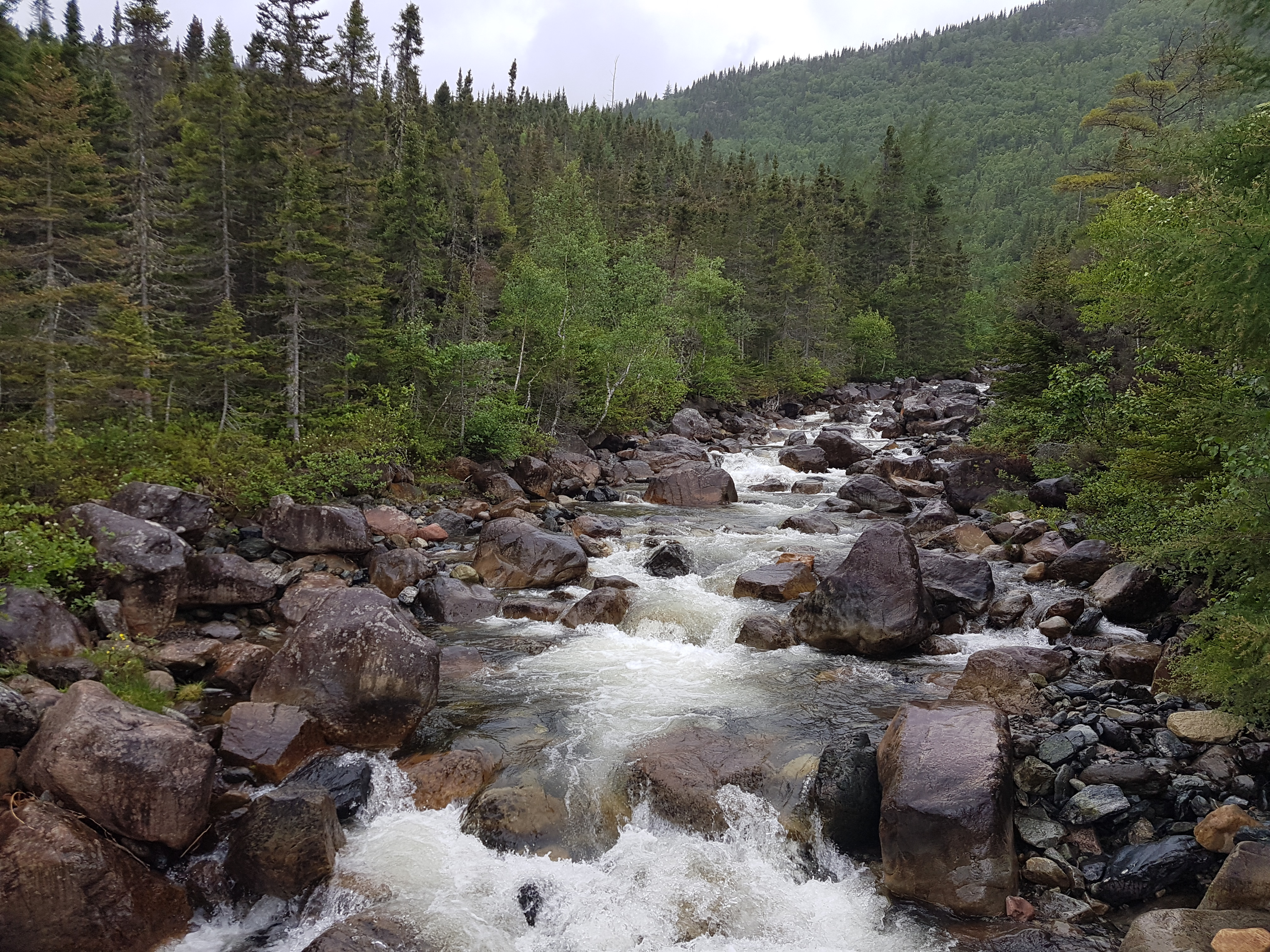
- Balsam fir and black spruce forest in Gaspésie National Park

Ecology
- Borders: Boreal Shield; Mixedwood Plains

Geography
- Area: 213,863 km^{2} (82,573 mi^{2})
- Country: Canada
- Provinces: New Brunswick; Nova Scotia; Prince Edward Island; Quebec
- Climate type: Humid continental and subarctic

The Atlantic Maritime Ecozone, as defined by the Commission for Environmental Cooperation (CEC), is an ecozone which covers the Canadian provinces of Prince Edward Island, Nova Scotia, and New Brunswick, as well as the Gaspé Peninsula of Quebec. It is adjacent to the Atlantic Marine Ecozone to the east, and the Mixedwood Plains to the west. The roughly-corresponding Level I Ecoregion to this ecozone in the United States Environmental Protection Agency's classification, which is also part of the CEC system, is the Northern Forests ecoregion, though that classification includes the woodlands and swamps of northern Michigan and Minnesota, which are adjacent to the Boreal Shield ecozone.

The coastal areas are generally cooler in summer and warmer in winter than the inland regions, with richer soils suitable for farming. Hence, coastal communities have the greatest concentration of the zone's 2.5 million inhabitants. The largest urban area in this ecozone is Halifax.

== Geography ==
The Atlantic Maritime ecozone consists of two major regions, the Appalachians which are hilly with poor soils, and the coastal plains which have much richer soil. The inland regions are primarily highlands of igneous bedrock with acidic soils that support expansive forests, but are not adaptable to agricultural uses. The coastal plains are atop sedimentary bedrock, with rich soils suitable for agricultural applications.

The acadian forest is a mixedwood or transitional forest, exhibiting features of both deciduous and boreal forests.

=== Ecoprovinces ===
This ecozone can be further subdivided into three ecoprovinces:

- Appalachian-Acadian Highlands
- Fundy Uplands
- Northumberland Lowlands

== Climate ==
The entire region is relatively cool and moderate during the summer, with mean July temperatures at 18 °C. Winters tend to be mild but long, with January mean temperatures between −2.5 °C and −10 °C. Proximity to the Atlantic Ocean results in a humid environment with significant precipitation, varying from an annual average of 1425 mm along the coasts to 1000 mm inland. This is the most active storm region in Canada.

Coastal areas are typically warmer during the winter, and cooler during the summer, than other regions of the ecozone. They also experience frequent sea fog in late spring and early summer due to the interaction of the warm Gulf Stream currents with the much colder Labrador Current.

With an average of nearly 180 frost-free days, the coasts may have up to 1,750 growing degree days, whereas the inland areas of New Brunswick have an average annual growing season of 1,500 growing degree days, and just 80 frost-free days.

== Protected areas ==
This ecozone contains a number of protected areas, including national and provincial parks. The national parks include Cape Breton Highlands National Park, Forillon National Park, Fundy National Park, Kejimkujik National Park, Kouchibouguac National Park, and Prince Edward Island National Park.
