= Ecozone =

An ecozone may refer to:

- Biogeographic realm, the broadest biogeographic division of Earth's land surface (referred to as ecozone by BBC)
- Biome, a large collection of flora and fauna occupying a major habitat
- Bioregion, an ecologically and geographically defined area that is smaller than a biogeographical realm, but larger than an ecoregion
- Ecoregion, an ecologically and geographically defined area that is smaller than a bioregion
- Ecozone (Canada), one of 15 first-level ecological land classifications in Canada
