= Northwest Atlantic Marine Ecozone =

Canadian marine ecozone

Northwest Atlantic Marine
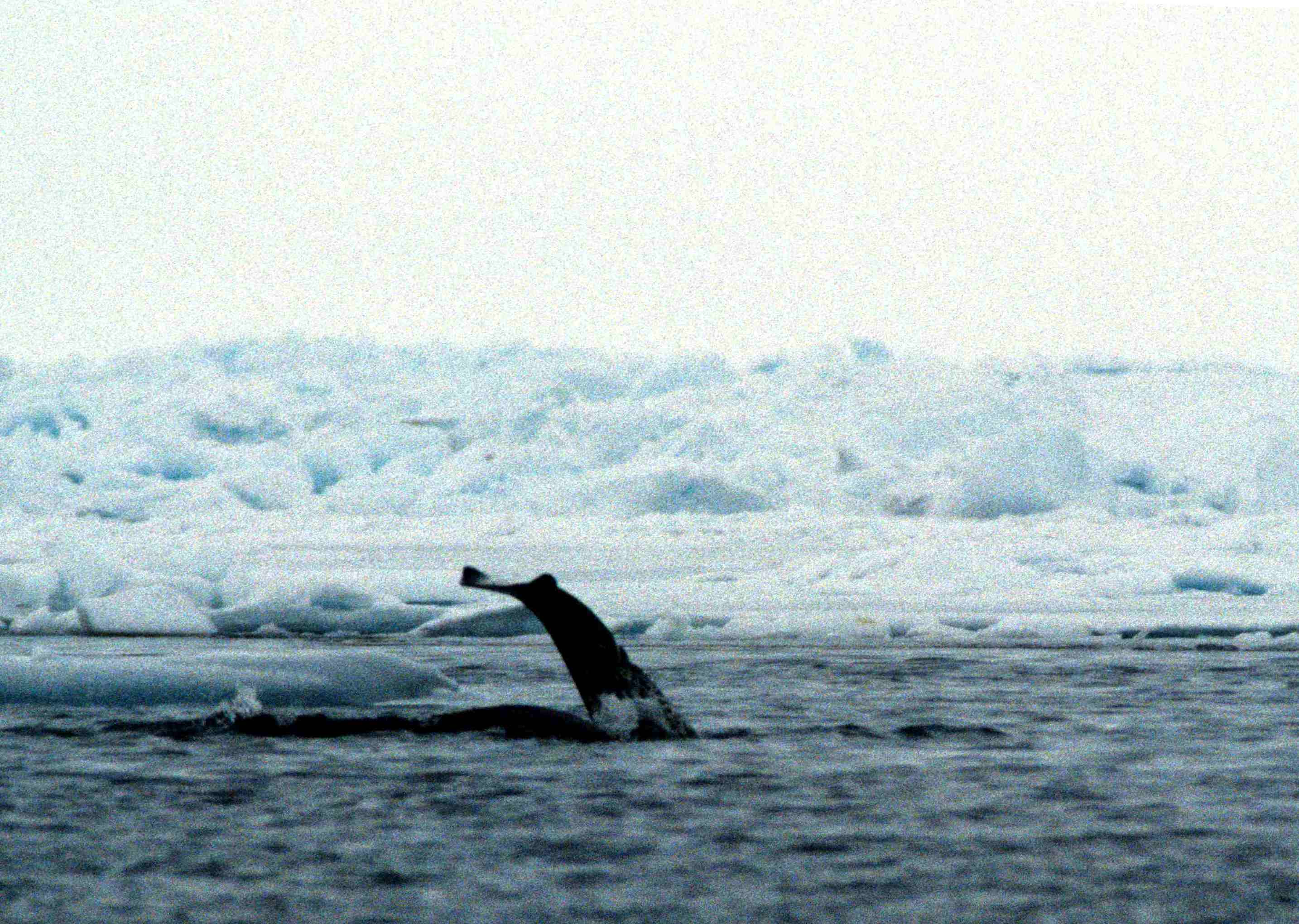
- Fluke of a narwhal off the coast of Bylot Island, Nunavut

Ecology
- Borders: Arctic Archipelago Marine; Atlantic Marine

Geography
- Country: Canada
- Province: New Brunswick; Newfoundland and Labrador; Nova Scotia; Nunavut; Prince Edward Island; Quebec
- Oceans or seas: Atlantic Ocean and Arctic Ocean

The Northwest Atlantic Marine Ecozone, as defined by the Commission for Environmental Cooperation (CEC), is a Canadian marine ecozone forming a transitional region between the cold northern waters of the Arctic Ocean and the more temperate waters in its southern extent.

== Geography ==
Stretching in a narrow strip offshore from Ellesmere Island and Devon Island in Baffin Bay, it runs parallel to the coast of Bylot Island and Baffin Island until meeting it at the Cumberland Peninsula. It covers the waters of the Davis Strait and the Hudson Strait, Ungava Bay and portions of the Labrador Sea, including all coastal areas of Labrador and the northern coast of Newfoundland. It also includes the Gulf of Saint Lawrence to the mouth of the Saint Lawrence River.

The cold, highly saline North Atlantic Deep Water forms in the Labrador Sea and flows at great depth along the western edge of the North Atlantic. Moreover, in this ecozone the cold Labrador Current meets the Gulf Stream at the Grand Banks, and together with the freshwater discharge from the Saint Lawrence River, moderate the climate of the coastal areas of the Maritimes.

There are more than 440,000 islands in this zone.

=== Regions ===
This ecozone consists of eight regions, namely:

- Hudson Strait
- Labrador Shelf
- Newfoundland Shelf
- North Gulf Shelf
- Saint Lawrence River Estuary
- Magdalen Shallows
- Laurentian Channel
- Scotian Shelf (only a small portion near Cape Breton Island)

== Climate ==
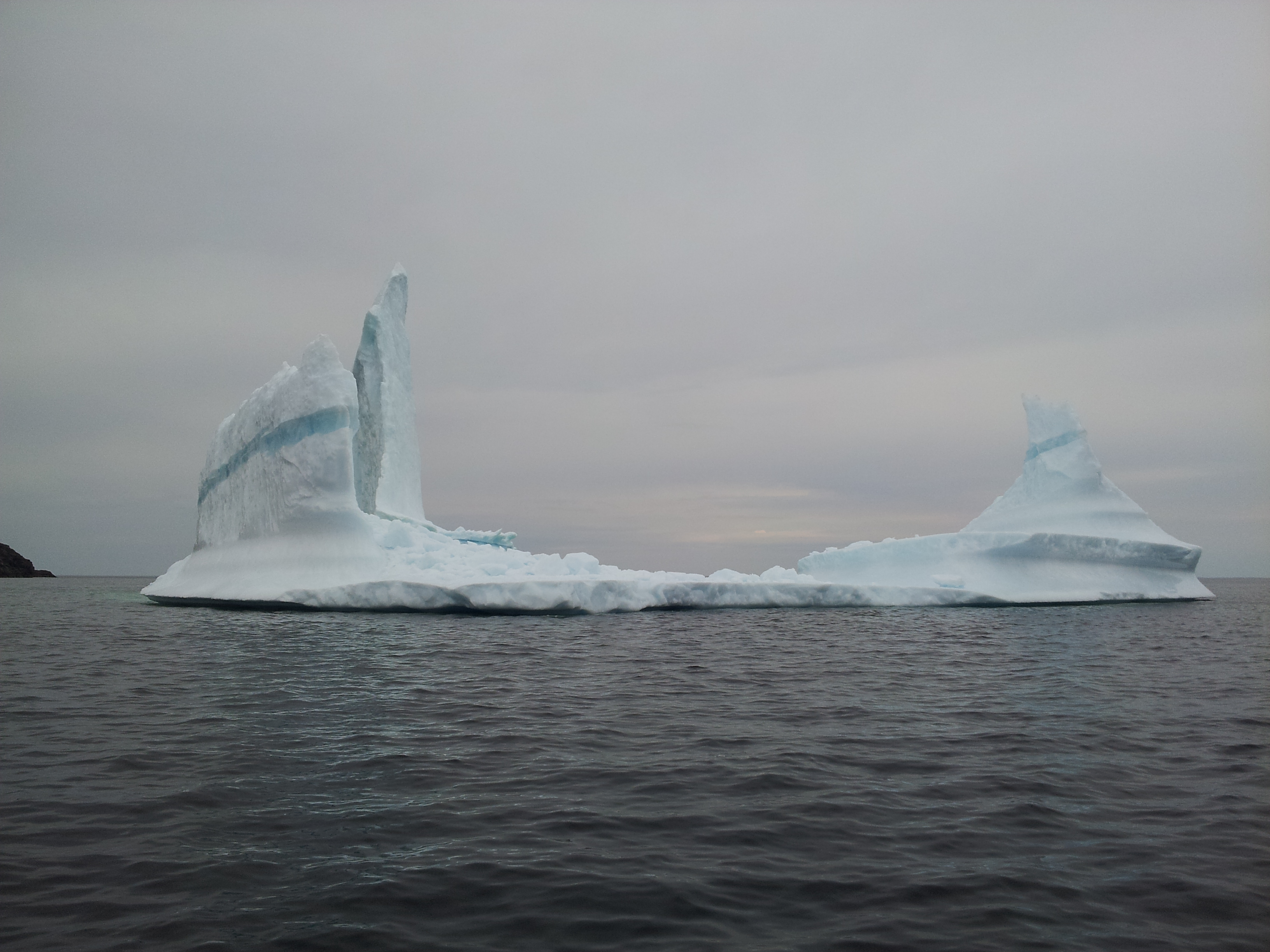
Iceberg in Notre Dame Bay, Newfoundland

This ecozone's climate varies throughout its extent, with temperatures differing by 20 °C between the arctic waters in the north and the Gulf Stream in the south. Sub-surface temperatures are always below the freezing point, but the salinity of the waters prevents them from freezing. Surface sea ice forms throughout this region, and thousands of icebergs may be observed between the northeast coast of Newfoundland and the Grand Banks. The Saint Lawrence River freezes over during the winter, closing the important shipping channel until the ice clears in the summer.

Summer tides may reach 9 to 12 m, though they tend to be exaggerated in Ungava Bay and more subdued in the Gulf of Saint Lawrence.
