= Creston Valley Wildlife Management Area =

Protected area of British Columbia, Canada

- IUCN category IV (habitat/species management area)
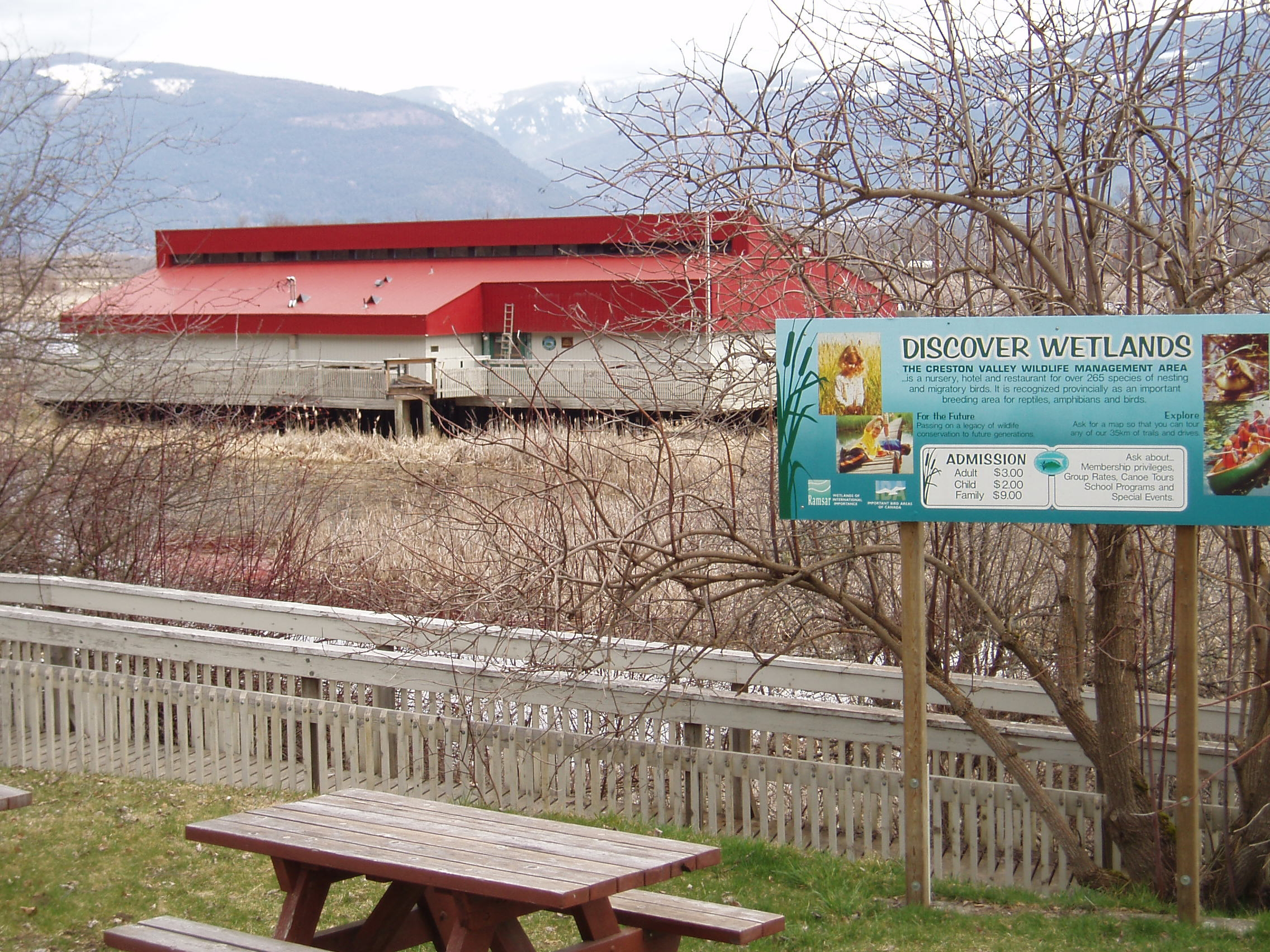
- Interactive map of Creston Valley Wildlife Management Area
- Nearest city: Creston, British Columbia
- Coordinates: 49°10′N 116°35′W
- Area: 69 square kilometres (27 sq mi)
- Established: 1968
- Governing body: Creston Valley Wildlife Management Area
- Website: crestonwildlife.ca

Ramsar Wetland
- Official name: Creston Valley
- Designated: 21 February 1994
- Reference no.: 649

The Creston Valley Wildlife Management Area is a Canadian river delta wetland and Wildlife Management Area near Creston in south-central British Columbia, on the floodplain of the Kootenay River at the south end of Kootenay Lake. Predominantly marshland, it was classified as a wetland of international importance on February 21, 1994, and is also a globally significant Important Bird Area. It is one of the "few significant agricultural areas of the province", and is in the Montane Cordillera. It stretches north along Kootenay Lake for approximately 20 km, and south to the United States border. It is both the only breeding site of the Forster's tern and the only site with leopard frogs in the province, as well as one of the few Canadian habitats for the Coeur D'Alene salamander. Creston Valley provides staging and nesting areas for migratory birds on the Pacific Flyway.

It covers an area of approximately 69.0 km^{2} of provincial Crown land. The wetland also contains the 15 km^{2} Duck Lake and 17 marshes. To the east are the Purcell Mountains and to the west the Selkirk Mountains.

The area is managed by the Creston Valley Wildlife Management Area to prevent invasive species from establishing themselves in the wetland, particularly targeting cattails or reed canary grass. This is done by periodically drawing down the water level of the marshes. According to Brian Stushnoff, the area's manager, a strategy exists "to rehabilitate areas that get choked with vegetation, drying them up and then ploughing up the ground to get rid of the seed bank that develops over time". This also ensures broad biodiversity by preventing one plant species from dominating the region.

== Wildlife Interpretation Centre ==
The Wildlife Interpretation Centre is located 11 kilometers west of Creston off Hwy 3 and is open from May to October. The Centre features natural history displays, a hands-on science lab, viewing towers and a gift shop. Environmental educational programs and events are offered for schools, groups and visitors, including guided walks and canoe tours.

== History ==
The Creston Valley Wildlife Management Area was established in 1968, and acquired its mandate via the Creston Valley Wildlife Act. This followed nearly 26 years of persistence by conservationists, biologists and nearby residents who wished to protect Duck Lake and its adjoining wetland habitats. Subsequently, with assistance from BC Hydro and Ducks Unlimited, a system of dykes and other control structures were built to manage water levels in Duck Lake, and hence the wetlands, reducing the impact of yearly drought and flood cycles.

Archaeological evidence indicates that First Nations have lived in the area for thousands of years. The area is the traditional territory of the Ktunaxa people.
