= Taiga Plains Ecozone =

Ecozone in Canada

Taiga Plains
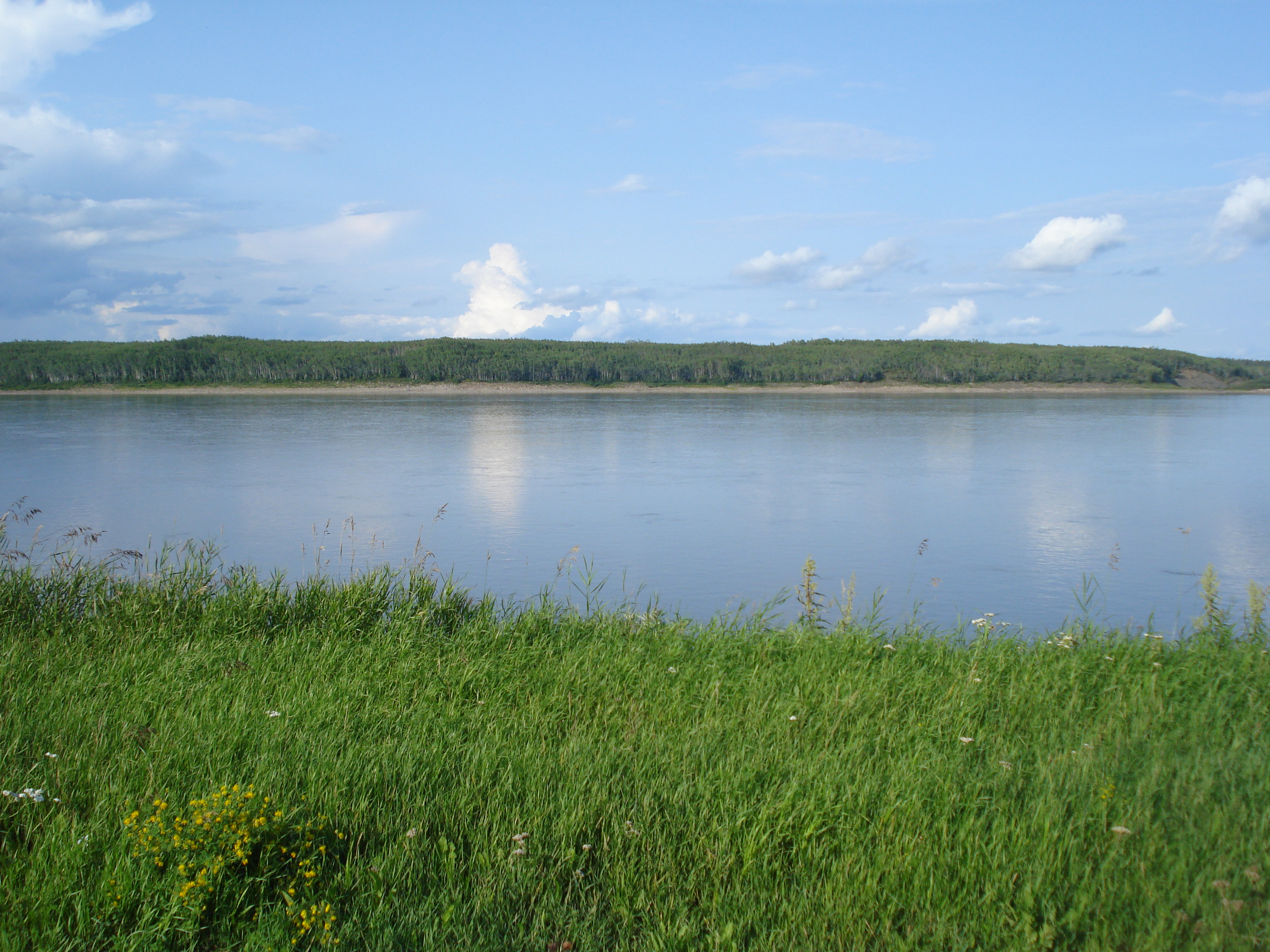
- Hay River Lowland ecoregion of the Taiga Plains ecozone

Ecology
- Borders: List: Boreal Cordillera; Boreal Plains; Southern Arctic; Taiga Cordillera; Taiga Shield

Geography
- Area: 652,125 km^{2} (251,787 mi^{2})
- Country: Canada
- Provinces: Alberta; British Columbia; Northwest Territories; Yukon
- Climate type: Subarctic

The Taiga Plain places, as defined by the Commission for Environmental Cooperation (CEC), is a Canadian terrestrial ecozone that covers most of the western Northwest Territories, extending to northwest Alberta, northeast British Columbia and slightly overlapping northeastern Yukon.

It is the site of the Peace-Athabasca Delta, a globally significant wetland in Wood Buffalo National Park, and Nahanni National Park Reserve.

== Geography ==
Its eastern boundary is located by Great Bear and Great Slave lakes in the Taiga Shield, site of the world's oldest known rock formations. To its south are the Boreal Plains, a vast forest of spruce and other timber with numerous wetland habitats. Portions of Wood Buffalo National Park and Whooping Crane Summer Range, the only nesting area for the critically endangered whooping crane, overlap onto the Taiga Plains from the Boreal Plains. To the west it abuts the foothills of the Boreal Cordillera in British Columbia and southern Yukon, and the Taiga Cordillera further north. These two ecozones comprise the Mackenzie Mountains. Its northern borders are with the Southern Arctic ecozone in northeastern Northwest Territories, and the Arctic Archipelago Marine ecozone at the delta of Canada's largest river, the Mackenzie.

The ecozone consists primarily of strata of limestone, shale, and sandstone sedimentary rocks, and has formed wide flat plains with rolling terrain throughout. The sedimentary layers contain some "rich natural reservoirs of oil and gas". The western portion, dominated by the Mackenzie, is more rugged with deep canyons and trenches cut by the river and tributaries.

=== Ecoprovinces ===
This ecozone can be further subdivided into three ecoprovinces:

- Great Bear Lowlands
- Hay-Slave Lowlands
- Mackenzie Foothills

== Climate ==
Summers are cool and short in this sub-arctic climate, with mean temperatures ranging from 7 °C in the north to 14 °C in the south. Winters are long and very cold in the Mackenzie Delta, with a typical January mean of -26 °C, but are somewhat milder in the southern extent, with a mean January temperature of -15 °C. Little precipitation falls here, an annual average of 250 to 500 mm throughout the zone. Snow and ice cover lasts at least six months, and it is not unusual for it to persist for eight months.

== Conservation ==
A number of protected areas have been established to protect representative and/or significant portions of this ecozone. These include the Mackenzie Bison Sanctuary, Nahanni National Park Reserve, and Wood Buffalo National Park.
