= Prairies Ecozone =

Ecosystem in Canada

Prairies
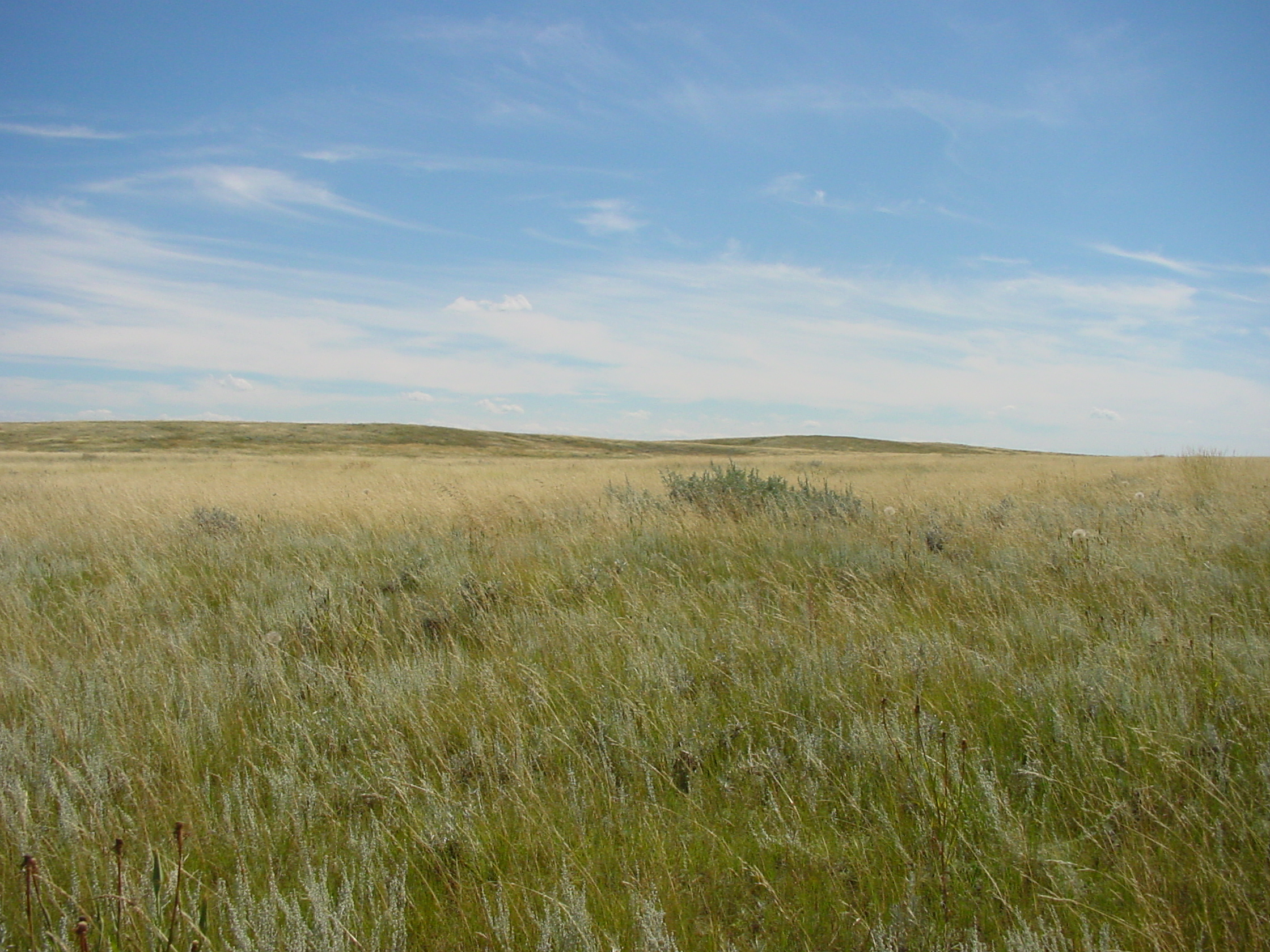
- Mixed Grassland ecoregion of the Prairies

Ecology
- Borders: Boreal Plains; Montane Cordillera

Geography
- Area: 465,094 km^{2} (179,574 mi^{2})
- Country: Canada
- Provinces: Alberta; Manitoba; Saskatchewan
- Climate type: Cold semi-arid and humid continental

The Prairies Ecozone is a Canadian terrestrial ecozone which spans the southern areas of the Prairie provinces of Alberta, Saskatchewan, and Manitoba. It is a productive agricultural area, and is commonly referred to as "Canada's breadbasket". Farmland covers about 94% of the land, and is the dominant domestic economic activity of the zone, as well as an important factor in Canadian foreign trade. Natural gas and oil are abundant in the area. The corresponding Level II ecoregion of the US Environmental Protection Agency is the Great Plains Ecoregion.

== Geography ==
Following Alberta's border with British Columbia, this ecozone is adjacent to the Montane Cordillera on the west. The two zones are bifurcated by the Boreal Plains about 70 kilometres southwest of Calgary, which also wraps around the remaining extent of the zone north of the United States border toward the Red River Valley. It is part of the Interior Plains, the Canadian extension of the Great Plains, and covers approximately 520,000 square kilometres of land and water.

Establishment of the agricultural industry has had a significant effect on the land, which now retains "little of the natural vegetation" it had before the area was settled. Fewer than half of the original wetlands in the region remain, though during years of high precipitation, numerous ephemeral wetlands may form, typically for very short periods of time. Characterised by vast tracts of flat and rolling plains, it nonetheless exhibits a variety of relief, including hummocky lands and deep river valleys.

The ecozone transformed into a relatively treeless grassland following the last glacial retreat from 11,000 to 8,000 years ago. The strata of sedimentary rock are from the Cretaceous and Tertiary periods, and contain "isolated pockets and cracks [with] rich reservoirs of oil and gas".

=== Ecoprovinces ===
This ecozone can be further subdivided into three ecoprovinces:

- Central Grassland
- Eastern Prairies
- Parkland Prairies

== Climate ==
Because of its location east of the Rocky Mountains, the Prairies ecozone can be semi-arid in some areas, annual precipitation generally increases farther east in the ecozone from 250 millimetres (9.8 in) in southern Alberta and Saskatchewan to 700 millimetres (28 in) in parts of Manitoba, as well humidity increases eastward through this zone. Winters are cold, due to the lack of a major body of water, and summers are warm, means can very and tend to be colder eastward due to the lack of a major body of water, and warmer in summer. Winters averages around −10 °C (14 °F), and summers around 15 °C (59 °F).

== Demographics ==
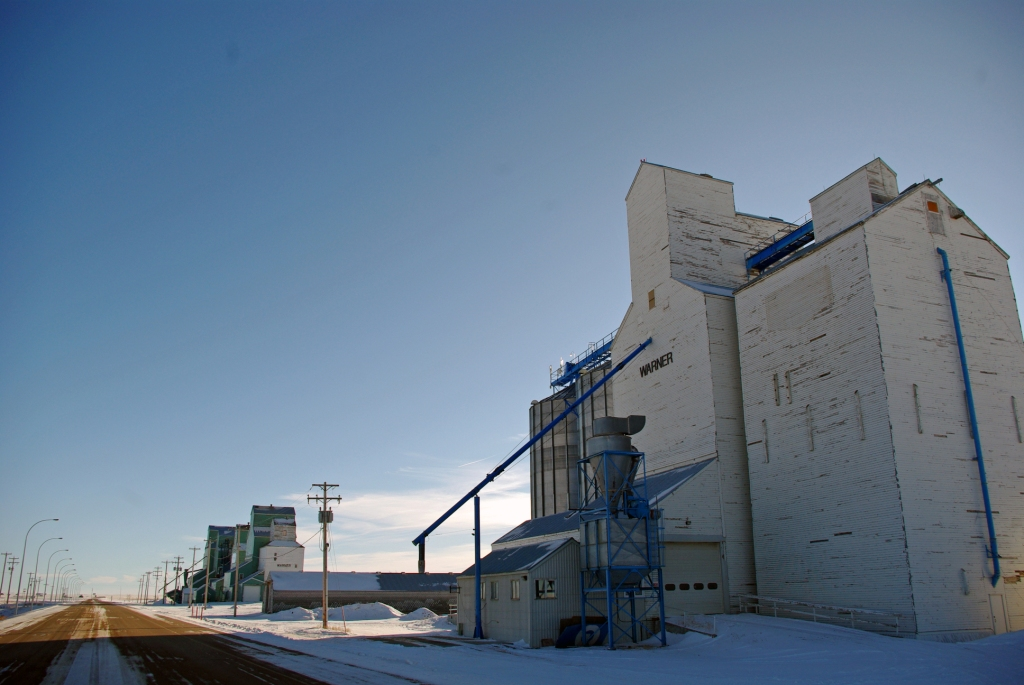
A grain elevator, for storing farmed grains typical on the Prairie

Despite the predominance of farming, less than 10% of the population is involved in agriculture. It is a highly urbanized area, with all major population centres of these provinces located in this ecozone. These include Edmonton, Calgary, Regina, Saskatoon and Winnipeg, as well as Brandon, Moose Jaw, Red Deer and Lethbridge. Nearly 80% of the region's four million human inhabitants live in these and other urban areas.

== Conservation ==
A number of protected areas have been established to protect representative and/or significant portions of this ecozone. These include Elk Island National Park, Grasslands National Park, and Turtle Mountain Provincial Park.

== See also ==
- Northern short grasslands
