= Plug-in electric vehicles in Saskatchewan =

As of 2022, there were about 1,200 electric vehicles in Saskatchewan, accounting for about 0.1% of all vehicles in the province. As of 2021, 5.2% of new vehicles registered in the province were electric.

== Government policy ==
In its 2021–22 budget, the province of Saskatchewan announced that all electric vehicles will be subject to an annual road usage fee of $150 per-year, the first such fee in Canada, on the justification electric vehicles do not contribute to fuel taxes that are used to fund highway maintenance. The tax has faced criticism from electric vehicle owners and from Regina mayor Sandra Masters for deterring electric vehicle ownership. The fee came into force on October 1, 2021.

As of May 2022, the province does not offer any tax rebates for electric vehicle purchases.

== Manufacturing ==
Saskatchewan has been proposed as a hub for the mining of lithium and rare-earth metals to be used in electric vehicle batteries.

== By region ==
=== Prince Albert ===
As of December 2022, there was one public DC charging stations in Prince Albert.

=== Regina ===
The first electric vehicles were added to the Regina municipal fleet in October 2022.

=== Saskatoon ===
The first electric vehicles were added to the Saskatoon municipal fleet in March 2021.
