= Northern Arctic Ecozone =

Ecosystem in northern Canada

Northern Arctic
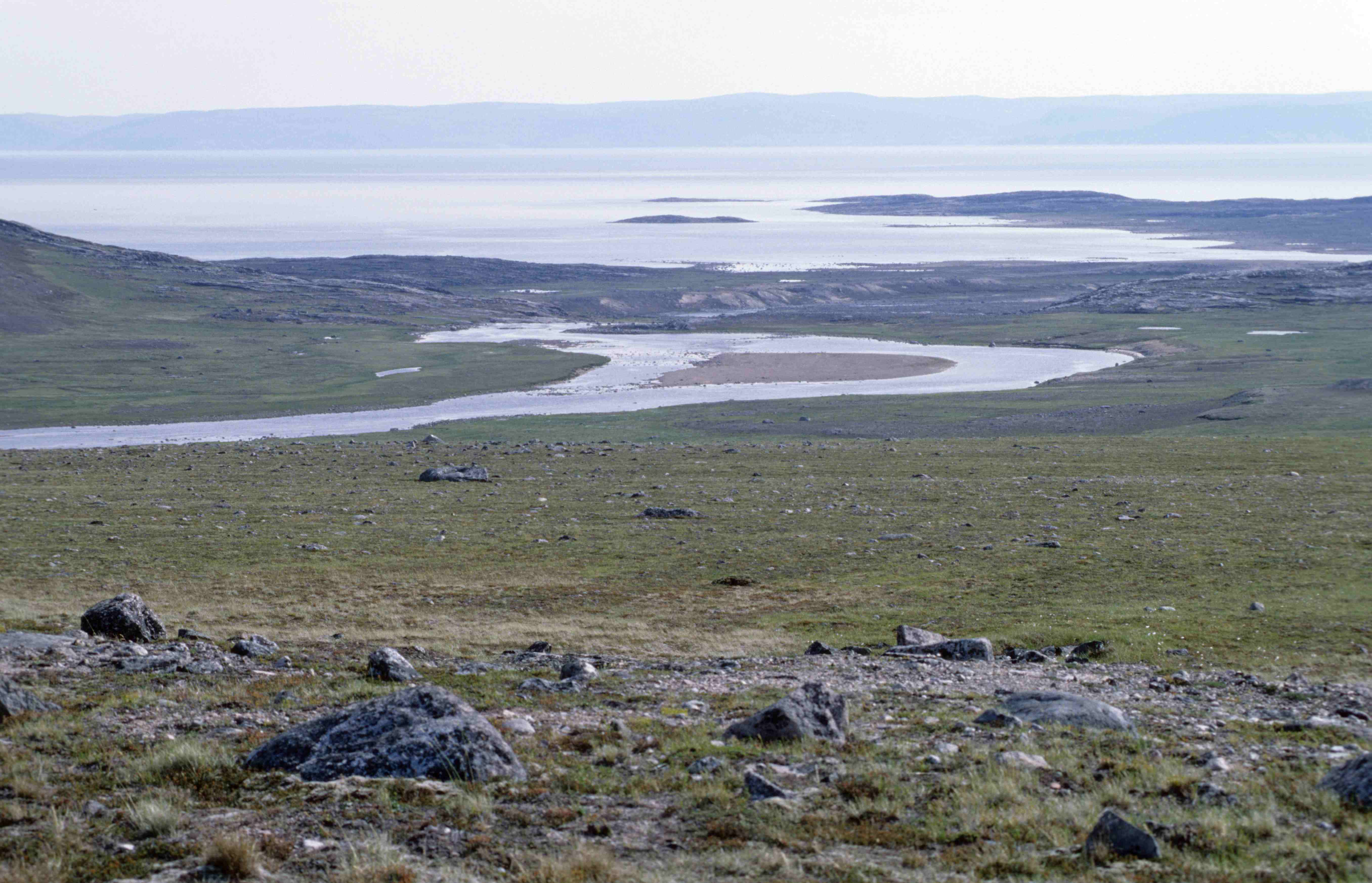
- Arctic tundra in Ukkusiksalik National Park, Nunavut

Ecology
- Borders: Arctic Cordillera; Southern Arctic

Geography
- Area: 1,507,872 km^{2} (582,193 mi^{2})
- Country: Canada
- States: Northwest Territories; Nunavut; Quebec
- Climate type: Polar

The Northern Arctic Ecozone is a Level II terrestrial ecoregion of North America designated by the Commission for Environmental Cooperation (CEC) in its North American Environmental Atlas. It is a Canadian terrestrial ecozone which includes most of the Canadian Arctic Archipelago, the Boothia and Melville Peninsulas of Nunavut, and the northwestern tip of Quebec. Its marine borders are with the Arctic Archipelago Marine Ecozone, and it is adjacent to the mainland Southern Arctic Ecozone.

Sparsely populated, it is home to 15,000 inhabitants, approximately 80% of whom are Inuit. The largest settlement is Iqaluit. The cold winters are very dark, typically having no daylight for weeks or even months north of the Arctic Circle.

== Geography ==
Palaeozoic and Mesozoic sedimentary rock forms the western portion of the ecozone, whereas Precambrian granite is the dominant feature in the east. Broad flat plains are common on the coastlines, and extend inland up to 10 kilometres (6 mi) in some parts. In the east, plateaus and rocky hills merge into the foothills of the Arctic Cordillera. The west is characterised by glacial deposits and "frost-shattered limestone" and sandstone.

A permanent layer of permafrost may be up to one kilometre thick, and lies under a shallow stratum of waterlogged active soils that cyclically freeze and thaw, creating patterned ground. Its features are similar to the badlands found in the southwestern United States.

=== Ecoprovinces ===
This ecozone can be further subdivided into seven ecoprovinces:

- Baffin Uplands
- Boothia-Foxe Shield
- Ellesmere Basin
- Foxe-Boothia Lowlands
- Parry Channel Plateau
- Sverdrup Island
- Victoria Lowlands

== Climate ==
The region is extremely cold, with temperatures rising above the freezing point only in July and August. Short, cold summers give way to bitterly cold, dark winters with mean January temperatures less than −30 °C in the northern islands. Little precipitation falls here, with a typical annual total of 250 mm, but may exceed 500 mm in its extreme southeastern extent. Snowfall may occur at any time, and snow cover persists from September to June.

Despite the low precipitation, the permafrost's ability to prevent water from draining through the soil, and the abundant snow and ice cover throughout the zone ensure that the climate is usually moist.

The northern waters are permanently frozen, but coastal areas in the south may open in the summer, though numerous large ice floes persist.

== Conservation ==
A number of protected areas have been established to protect representative and/or significant portions of this ecozone. These include Aulavik National Park, Auyuittuq National Park, Sirmilik National Park, Qausuittuq National Park, Quttinirpaaq National Park, and Ukkusiksalik National Park.
