= Southern Arctic Ecozone =

Ecozone in Canada

Southern Arctic
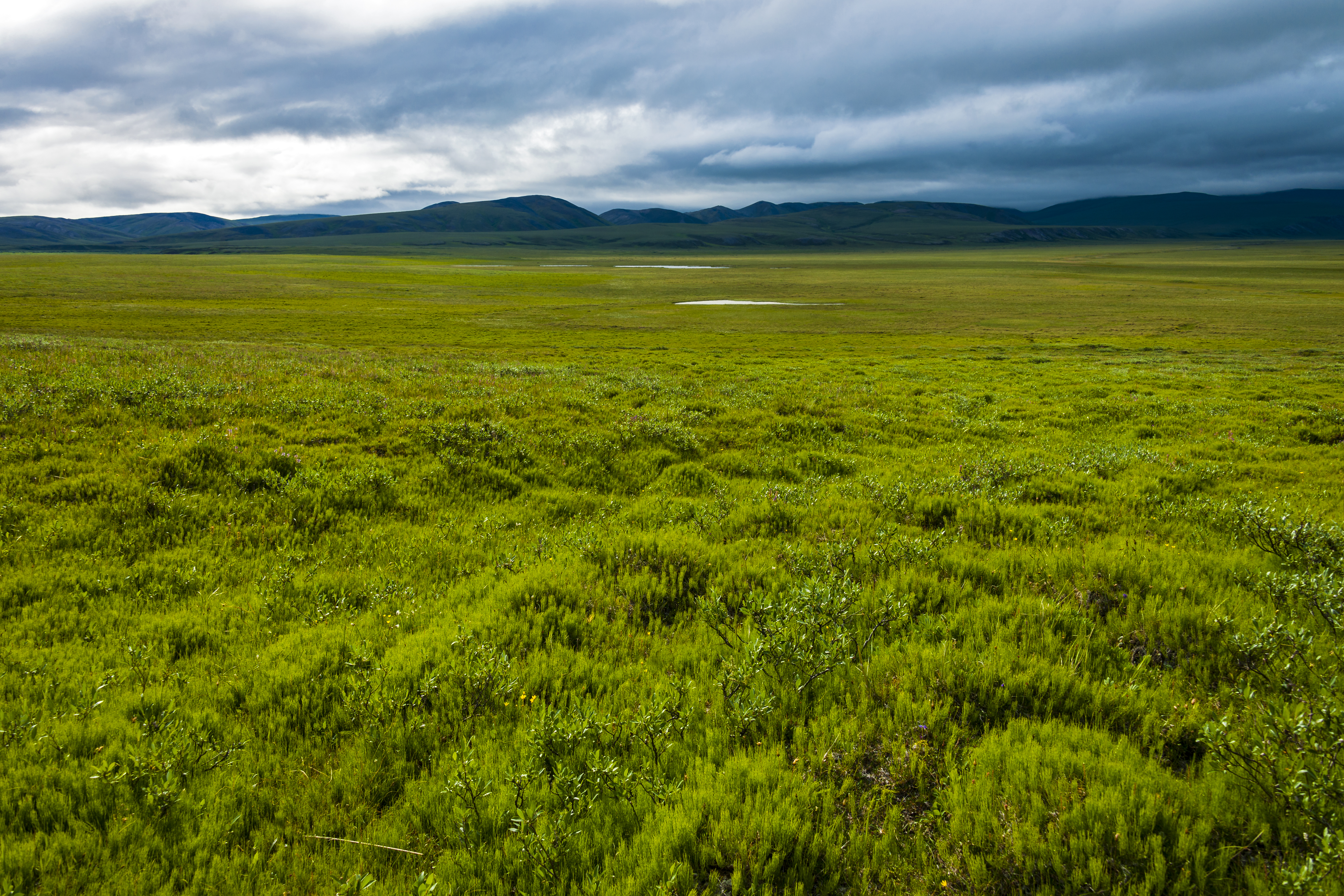
- Arctic tundra in Ivvavik National Park, Yukon

Ecology
- Borders: List: Hudson Plains; Northern Arctic; Taiga Cordillera; Taiga Plains; Taiga Shield

Geography
- Area: 839,760 km^{2} (324,230 sq mi)
- Country: Canada
- Provinces: Manitoba; Northwest Territories; Nunavut; Quebec; Yukon
- Climate type: Polar and subarctic

The Southern Arctic Ecozone, as defined by the Commission for Environmental Cooperation (CEC), is a Canadian terrestrial ecozone which spans the northern coast of mainland Northwest Territories, most of northern mainland Nunavut excepting the northeast peninsula, and a portion of northwestern Quebec. Its two constituent territories are interrupted by Hudson Bay. The ecozone can also be described as including the northernmost part of the Interior Plains of Western Canada and parts of the Canadian Shield located on both sides of northern Hudson Bay.

It is sparsely populated, with less than 10,000 inhabitants in 17 major settlements, the largest of which is Rankin Inlet. About 80% of the population is Inuit.

== Geography ==
Its southern boundary demarcates the tree line, and to the north it meets the Northern Arctic terrestrial ecozone and the Arctic Archipelago Marine ecozone. It was formed from glacial deposits left by retreating glaciers about 8,500 years ago, which amassed into moraines cut by long eskers up to 100 km long. The scouring of the land by the 3 km thick glaciers left numerous depressions, some of which contained stray chunks of ice that, upon melting during warmer periods, created kettle lakes and ponds. The Precambrian granite bedrock of the Canadian Shield protrudes to the surface through other sedimentary deposits in areas that surround Hudson Bay. Moreover, glacial erratic chunks of this rock may have been transported to other areas by the ice sheet, sometimes into surroundings with no common elements.

Permafrost occurs in a continuous, permanent sheet throughout the zone, which consists primarily of rollings plains west of the Shield area. Just a few centimetres from the surface in some parts, it prevents water from penetrating deep into the soil, hence pooling and creating waterlogged soil that freezes regularly. Cyclic freezing and thawing of the soils results in irregular features throughout the terrain, including hummocks and polygonal shapes.

The land is characterised by "sprawling shrublands, wet sedge meadows, and cold, clear lakes".

=== Ecoprovinces ===
This ecozone can be further subdivided into three ecoprovinces:

- Amundsen Lowlands
- Keewatin Lowlands
- Ungava-Belcher

== Climate ==
This ecozone experiences short summers which are cool and moist, with mean July temperatures of about 10 °C. Winters are long, dark and bitterly cold, with average January mean temperatures of -30 °C. The area in Quebec is relatively warmer, with mean January temperatures of -18 °C.

Annual precipitation increases eastward through the zone, with 250 mm in the west and no more than 500 mm in the east. It also varies latitudinally, with about twice as much precipitation at its southern edge than at the northern fringes.

== Conservation ==
A number of protected areas have been established to protect representative and/or significant portions of this ecozone. These include Ivvavik National Park, Thelon Wildlife Sanctuary, Tuktut Nogait National Park, and Pingo Canadian Landmark.
