= Boreal Cordillera =

Canadian terrestrial ecozone

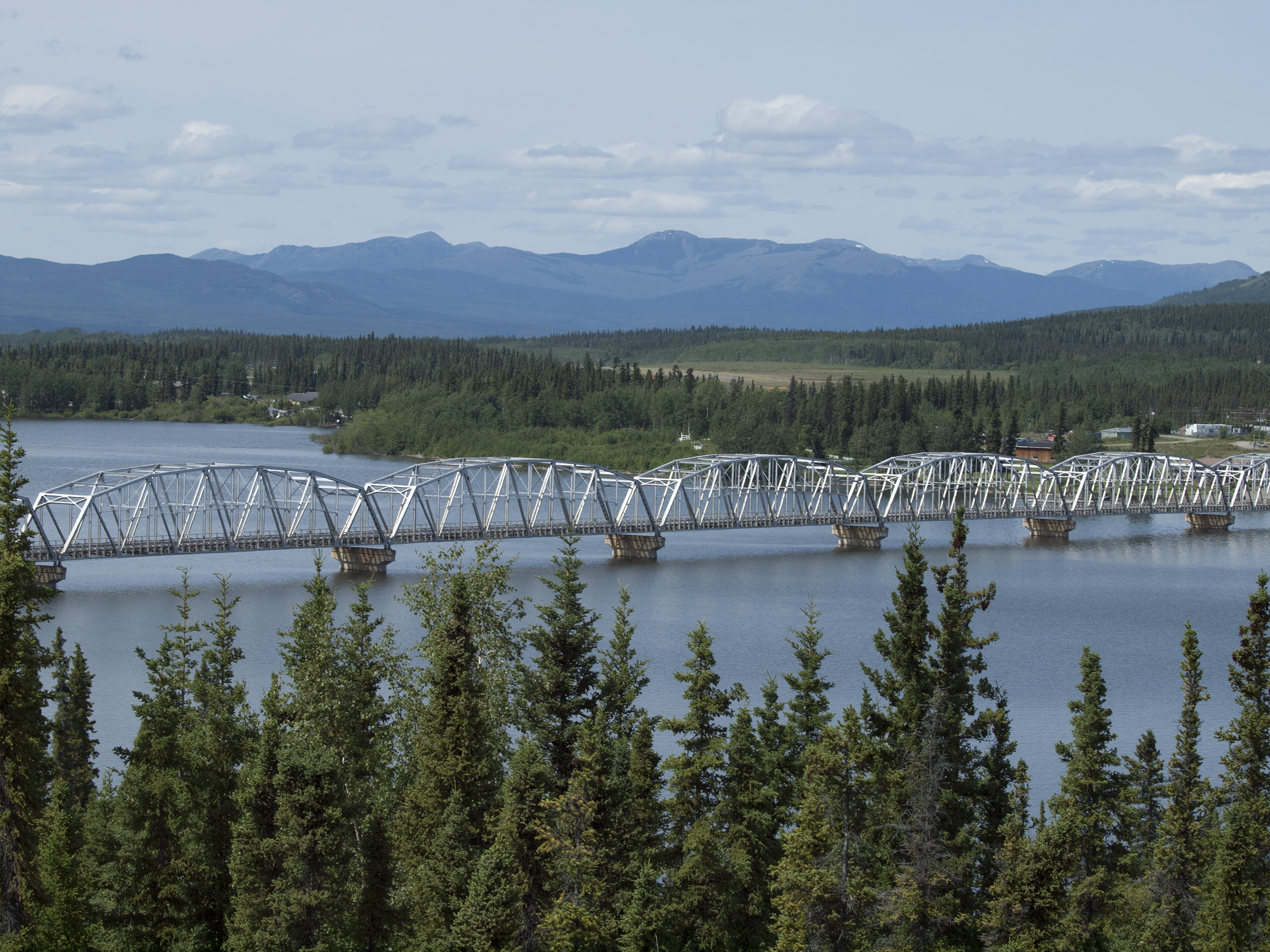
- Yukon Southern Lakes ecoregion of the Boreal Cordillera ecozone

Ecology
- Borders: List: Boreal Plains; Montane Cordillera; Pacific Maritime; Taiga Cordillera; Taiga Plains

Geography
- Area: 467,870 km^{2} (180,650 mi^{2})
- Country: Canada
- Provinces: British Columbia; Northwest Territories; Yukon
- Climate type: Subarctic

The Boreal Cordillera Ecozone, as defined by the Commission for Environmental Cooperation (CEC), is a Canadian terrestrial ecozone occupying most of the northern third of British Columbia and southern half of Yukon. Within it is found Kluane National Park and Reserve, and a small portion of the southern range of Nahanni National Park Reserve. Most of the area's population is based in the city of Whitehorse, and it contains most of Yukon's population. The portion in British Columbia is barely populated.

The main economic activity is mining, particularly of gold, which discovery in the region led to the Klondike Gold Rush. In addition to the area's rich mineral deposits, active industries exist in forestry and tourism.

== Geography ==
This mountainous ecozone is between the Montane Cordillera Ecozone to the south-east and the Taiga Cordillera Ecozone to the north. The three zones contain the Canadian Rockies. To the east are the Taiga Plains, and to the west is Alaska, though the ecozone is also adjacent to narrow strips of the Pacific Maritime. It is characterized by tall peaks and extensive plateau. The northern plateaux within the ecozone have a fairly gentle terrain, broken by numerous watercourses running through them, and are separated by wide valleys and their lowlands.

Just over 15% of the Boreal Cordillera, or roughly 73,320 km² consists of wetlands, of which 92% is treed wetland. It covers a total area of 471,400 km², with 241,240 km² of forest cover, of which 78.6% is softwood, 17.8% is mixedwood, and 3.6 is hardwood. The spruce beetle has been proliferating since the 1990s, and has destroyed vast areas of the spruce forest. The ecozone contains four forest regions - tundra, sub-alpine, coast, and boreal. There is also concern that the softwood harvest in southeastern Yukon does not have adequate natural regeneration.

=== Ecoprovinces ===
This ecozone can be further subdivided into four ecoprovinces:

- Northern Boreal Cordillera
- Southern Boreal Cordillera
- Western Boreal Cordillera
- Wrangel Mountains

== Climate ==
The interior intermontane plateau receive about 400 mm of annual precipitation, much less than the 1000 to 1500 mm levels in the eastern mountains, and the even higher levels in the western mountains. Snowfall accounts for 35 to 60% of all precipitation. Winters are long and cold, with January mean temperatures between −15 °C and −27 °C. Summers are warm but short, with July mean temperatures between 12 °C and 15 °C.

Alpine weather is more typical beyond the tree line at elevations above 1000 m, where frost can develop year-round. Average temperatures here remain below freezing for most of the year, and snowfall accounts for at least 70% of precipitation. Permafrost is typical in these regions, allowing for the growth of only shrubs, mosses and lichens.

Sudden violent storms may occur in the area during the summer, usually due to moist air masses arriving from the Pacific Ocean. Usually, however, the Pacific moderates the climate in this ecozone.

== Conservation ==
A number of protected areas have been established to protect representative and/or significant portions of this ecozone. These include Asi Keyi Territorial Park, Kluane National Park and Reserve, Mount Edziza Provincial Park, Spatsizi Plateau Wilderness Provincial Park, and Tatshenshini-Alsek Provincial Park.
