= Montane Cordillera =

Ecozone in south-central British Columbia

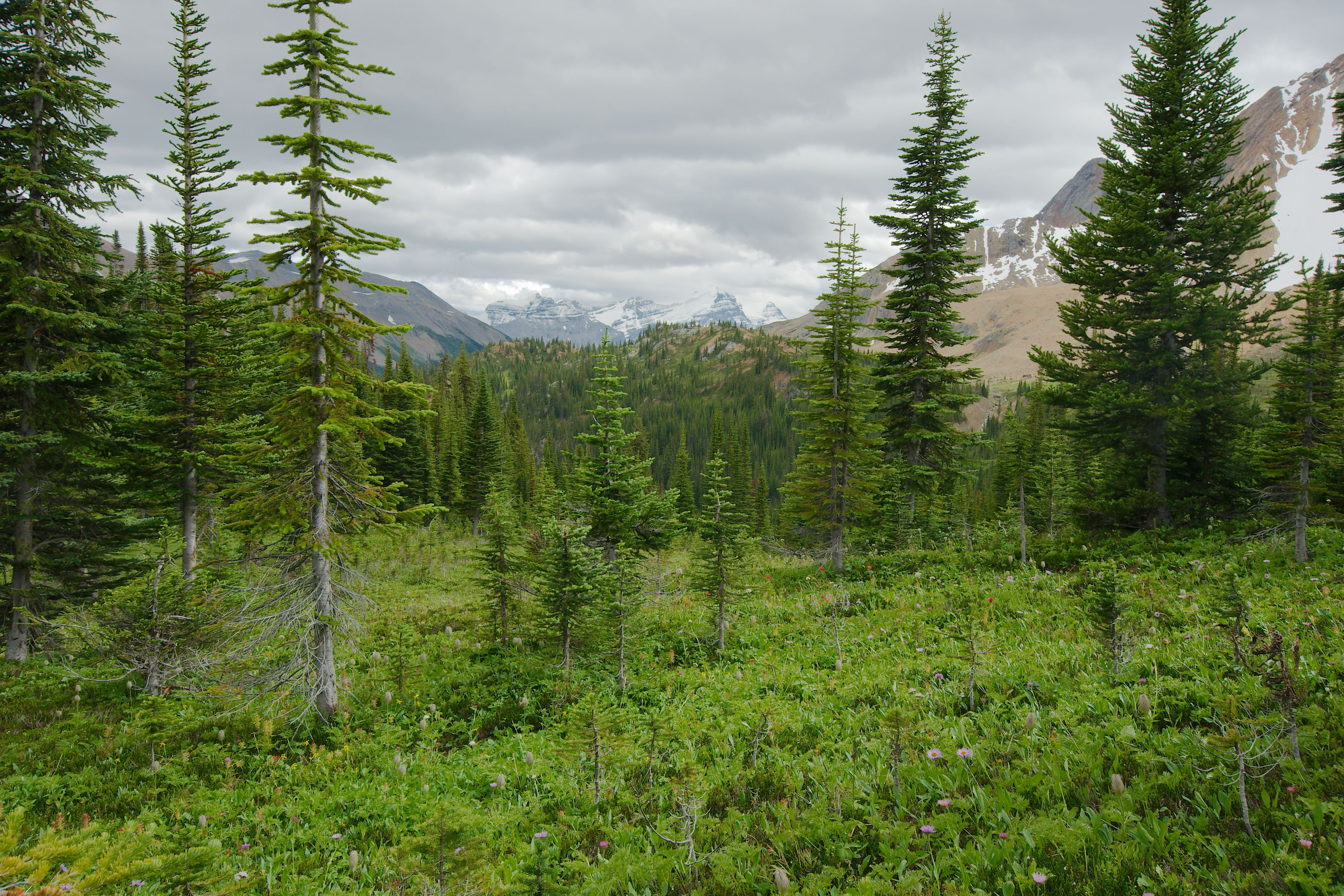
- Coniferous forest in Yoho National Park

Ecology
- Borders: Boreal Cordillera; Boreal Plains; Pacific Maritime; Prairies

Geography
- Area: 487,896 km^{2} (188,378 sq mi)
- Country: Canada
- Provinces: Alberta; British Columbia
- Climate type: Cold semi-arid, humid continental and subarctic

The Montane Cordillera Ecozone, as defined by the Commission for Environmental Cooperation (CEC), is an ecozone in south-central British Columbia and southwestern Alberta, Canada (an ecozone is equivalent to a Level I ecoregion in the United States). A rugged and mountainous ecozone spanning 473,000 square kilometres, it still contains "two of the few significant agricultural areas of the province", the Creston Valley and the Okanagan Valley. Primarily a mountainous region, it consists of rugged ecosystems such as alpine tundra, dry sagebrush and dense conifer forests. The interior plains are encircled by a ring of mountains. The area has a mild climate throughout the year, with typically dry summers and wet winters.

The corresponding name in the United States for this ecozone, where it is classed as a Level I ecoregion by the United States Environmental Protection Agency, which is identical though differently-named than the CEC system, is the Northwestern Forested Mountains ecoregion.

== Geography ==
It contains the headwaters for the Fraser and Columbia rivers and many of their tributaries, notably the Thompson and Kootenay.

It is bordered to the west by the Pacific Maritime Ecozone, to the north by the Boreal Cordillera Ecozone, to the northeast by the Boreal Plains Ecozone, and to the southeast by the Prairies Ecozone.

=== Ecoprovinces ===
This ecozone can be further subdivided into four ecoprovinces:

- Central Montane Cordillera
- Columbia Montane Cordillera
- Northern Montane Cordillera
- Southern Montane Cordillera

== Conservation ==
=== National parks ===
Seven national parks have been established in this ecozone:

- Banff National Park
- Glacier National Park
- Jasper National Park
- Kootenay National Park
- Mount Revelstoke National Park
- South Okanagan-Similkameen National Park Reserve (proposed)
- Waterton Lakes National Park
- Yoho National Park

=== Provincial parks ===
Dozens of provincial parks have been established in this ecozone. Some of the largest and most notable ones include:

- Itcha Ilgachuz Provincial Park
- Kakwa Provincial Park
- Mount Robson Provincial Park
- Purcell Wilderness Conservancy Provincial Park
- Tweedsmuir South Provincial Park
- Wells Gray Provincial Park

== See also ==
- Canadian Rockies
- Columbia Mountains
- Thompson Plateau
