= Pacific Maritime Ecozone =

Ecosystem in Canada

Pacific Maritime
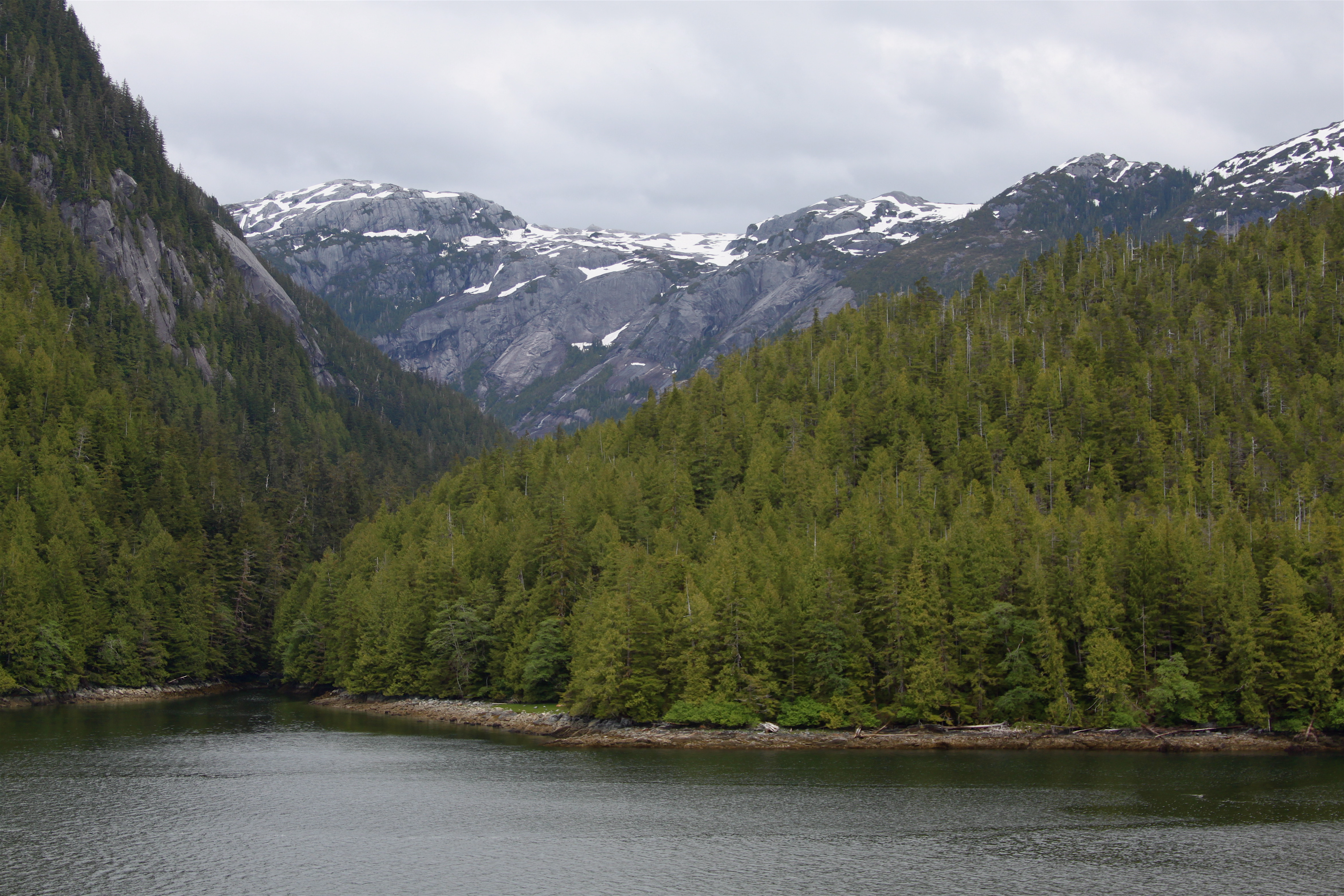
- Temperate rainforest typical of this ecozone

Ecology
- Borders: Boreal Cordillera; Montane Cordillera

Geography
- Area: 207,925 km^{2} (80,280 mi^{2})
- Country: Canada
- Provinces: British Columbia; Yukon
- Oceans or seas: Pacific Ocean, Salish Sea
- Climate type: Oceanic

The Pacific Maritime Ecozone, as defined by the Commission for Environmental Cooperation (CEC), is a Canadian terrestrial ecozone, spanning a strip approximately 200 kilometres wide along the British Columbia Coast, then narrowing along the border with Alaska. It also includes all marine islands of British Columbia and a small portion of the southwestern corner of the Yukon. Fourteen ecoregions comprise the Ecozone, ranging from the Mount Logan Ecoregion in the north to the Cascade Ecoregion and Lower Mainland Ecoregion in the south.

The name of the comparable ecozones in the United States, where Level II ecoregions correspond to the international term "ecozone", are the Marine West Coast Forest and the Northwestern Forested Mountains ecoregions. In the floristic province system, the region is described as part of the Rocky Mountain Floristic Region.

Also in use is a system of biogeoclimatic zones defined and used by the British Columbia government, which defines the same area as the Coastal Western Hemlock zone, though a small portion flanking the Strait of Georgia comprises the Coastal Douglas-fir zone. In the different ecoregion system established by the World Wildlife Fund, the region corresponds to the Pacific temperate rain forests ecoregion, sub-ecoregions of which are the Haida Gwaii ecoregion, Vancouver Island ecoregion, and British Columbia mainland coastal forests ecoregions.

== Geography ==
This ecozone is the most diverse in Canada, and perhaps the world. Its northern inland extent is primarily alpine tundra, whereas the picturesque northern coast features numerous fjords and valleys, with massive glaciers common in the mountains. To the south, the small flatland of the Fraser Valley is located at the southern end of the Coast Mountains, noted for temperate rainforests. Its marine areas are notable undersea kelp forests.

Lying on the Pacific Ring of Fire, it exhibits many hot springs.

=== Ecoprovinces ===
This ecozone can be further subdivided into three ecoprovinces:

- Georgia Depression
- Northern Coastal Mountains
- Southern Coastal Mountains

== Climate ==
This zone experiences the warmest and wettest climate in Canada. The lower Georgia Strait may receive as little as 600 mm of annual precipitation, but other areas in this zone receive as much as 3,000 mm. Moderated by the influence of the Pacific Ocean, the zone experiences mild winters and cool summers. Mean temperatures vary little throughout the year; January means are between 4 and 6 °C, and July means are between 12 and 18 °C.

== Flora and fauna ==
The region is the only home for some species of birds, including the American black oystercatcher, the chestnut-backed chickadee and the tufted puffin. The Gulf Islands and Saanich Peninsula contain "the last remnants of the highly endangered Garry oak ecosystem".

The Great Bear Rainforest is located entirely within this ecozone.

== Conservation ==
=== National parks ===
Four national parks have been established in this ecozone:

- Gulf Islands National Park Reserve
- Gwaii Haanas National Park Reserve and Haida Heritage Site
- Kluane National Park and Reserve
- Pacific Rim National Park Reserve

=== Provincial parks ===
Dozens of provincial parks have been established in this ecozone. Some of the largest and most notable ones include:

- Fiordland Conservancy
- Garibaldi Provincial Park
- Juan de Fuca Provincial Park
- Kitlope Heritage Conservancy
- Strathcona Provincial Park
- Tatshenshini-Alsek Provincial Park
