= Atlantic Marine Ecozone =

Canadian marine ecozone

Atlantic Marine
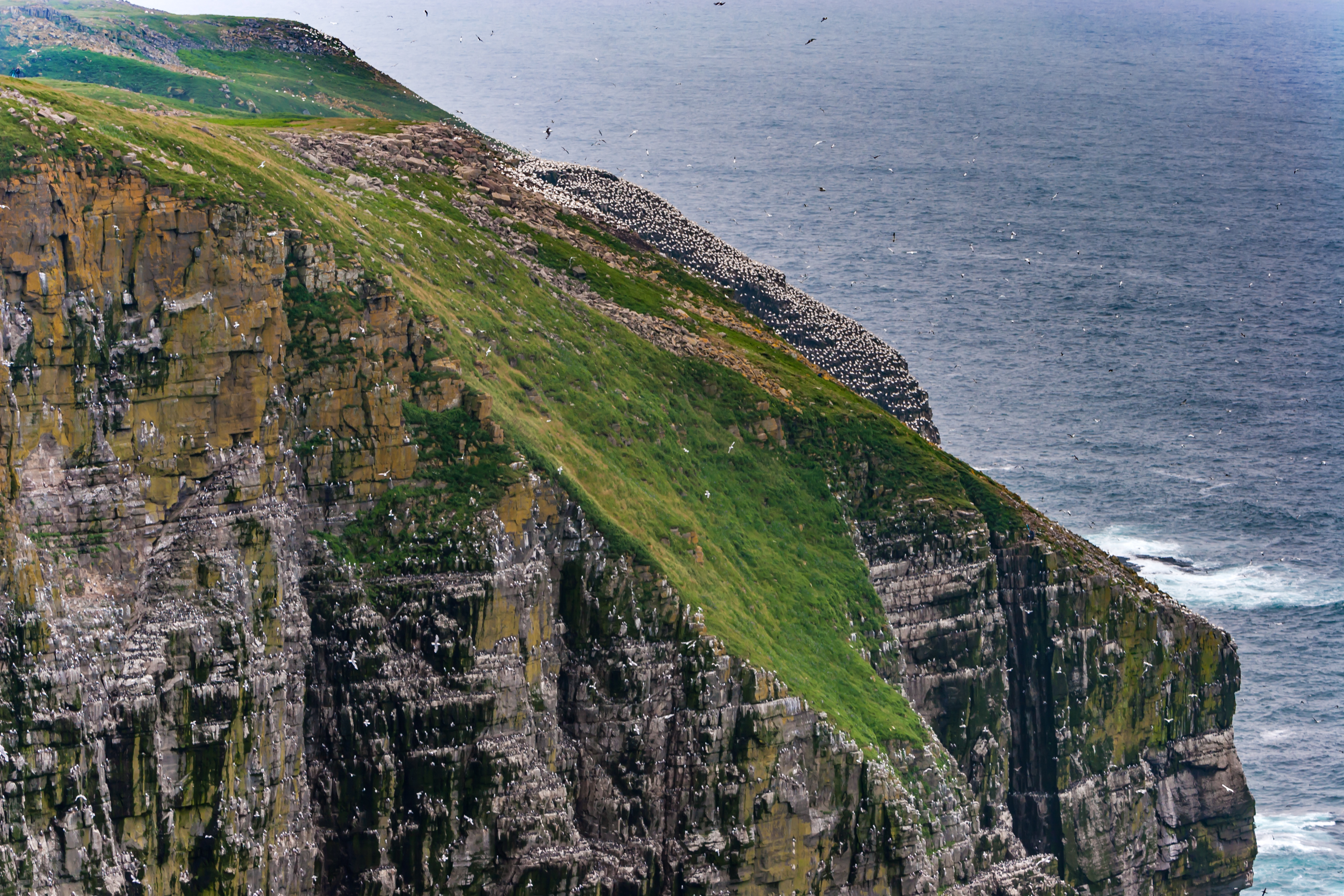
- Northern gannets nesting on a headland southeast of Cape St. Mary's, Newfoundland

Ecology
- Borders: Northwest Atlantic Marine

Geography
- Country: Canada
- Province: Newfoundland and Labrador; Nova Scotia
- Oceans or seas: Atlantic Ocean

The Atlantic Marine Ecozone, as defined by the Commission for Environmental Cooperation (CEC), is a Canadian marine ecozone that stretches from the Davis Strait to encompass the Grand Banks, to the Avalon Peninsula on the shores of Newfoundland. It includes all of the southern coast of Newfoundland, all the eastern coast of Nova Scotia, and portions of the Bay of Fundy and the Gulf of Maine.

== Geography ==
Most of the waters in this zone are thousands of metres deep, except the Grand Banks, which average about 150 metres before the sea floor drops precipitously beyond the continental shelf.

== Climate ==
Exceptionally dense fog is common where the cold Labrador Current merges with the warm Gulf Stream. By late winter, thick icebergs traverse the northern regions of this ecozone, from Greenland to Newfoundland. They have been feared by mariners for centuries, as well as being responsible for one of the deadliest disasters in maritime history, the sinking of the RMS Titanic in 1912. This resulted in the zone's colloquial name "Iceberg Alley". Tidal ranges throughout the zone are moderate, typically a few metres. The exception is the Bay of Fundy, whose famous tides may top 15 metres.

Surface water temperatures in August may reach 10 °C in the north, and up to 23 °C in the south.

In spring, phytoplankton biomass increases significantly, becoming a rich source of food within the ecozone.

== Fishing ==
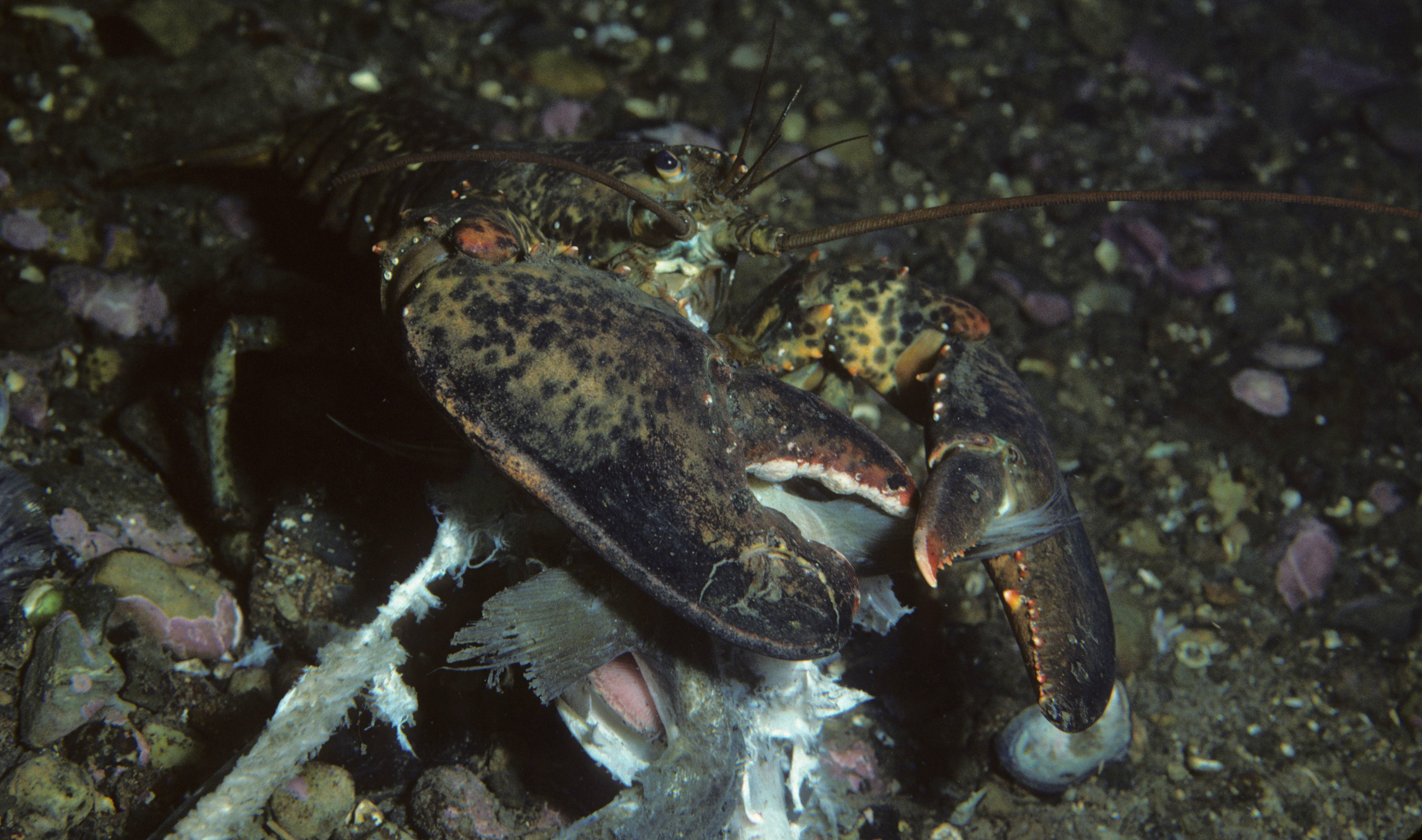
American lobster off the coast of Newfoundland

The waters of this zone have been overfished, and in 1992 the Government of Canada banned cod fishing, though there are no restrictions on other species. Shellfish species, including lobster, shrimp, and crab, have become an increasing component of the fishing industry, which has been in decline.

== Oil extraction ==
Since the late 1990s, the Hibernia oil field has become an important economic resource for Newfoundland and Labrador, and the Terra Nova oil field is increasingly important to Nova Scotia. Further oil and gas exploration is being conducted on the Scotian Shelf.
