= Taiga Cordillera =

Ecosystem in Canada

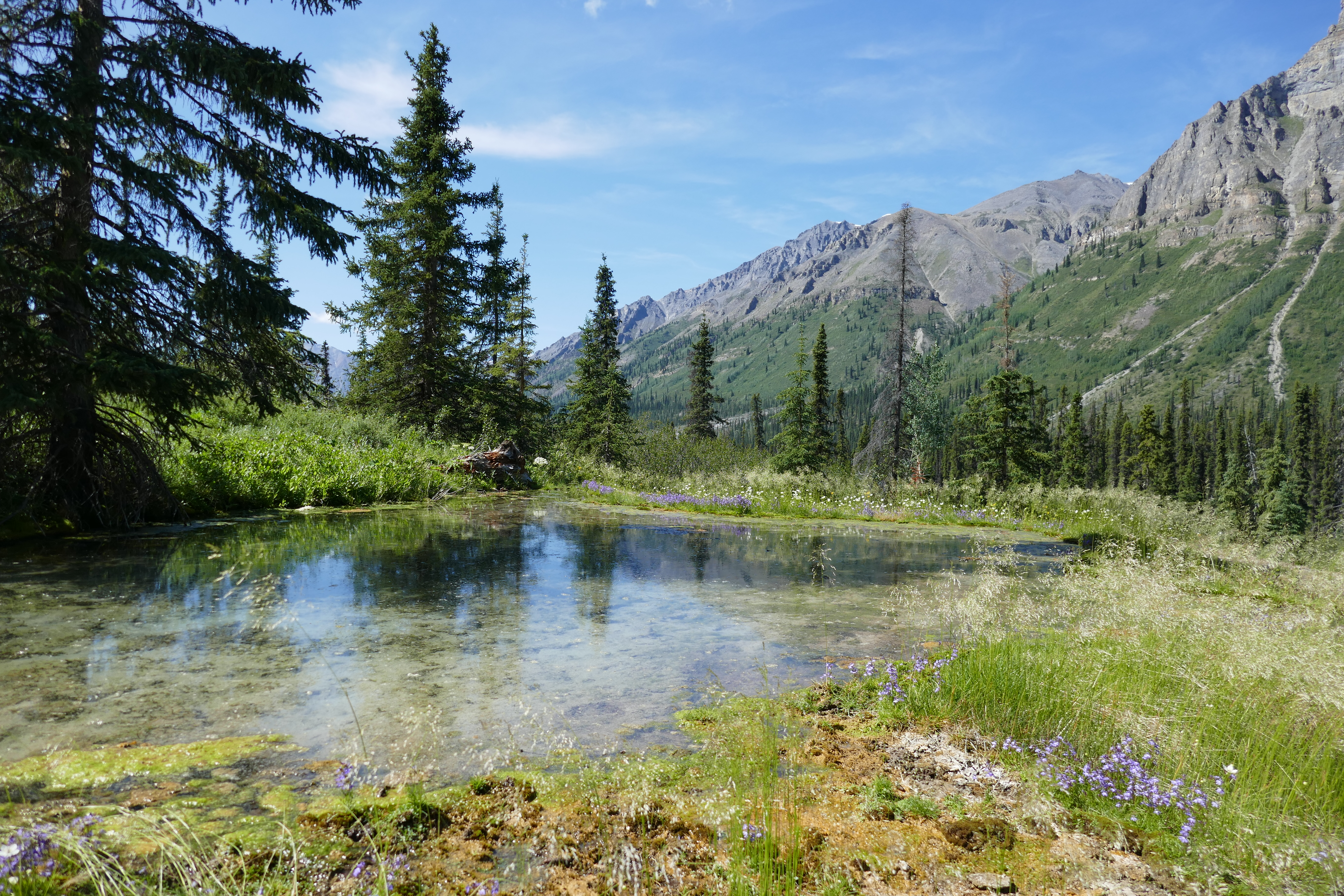
- Selwyn Mountains ecoregion of the Taiga Cordillera

Ecology
- Borders: Boreal Cordillera; Southern Arctic; Taiga Plains

Geography
- Area: 265,375 km^{2} (102,462 mi^{2})
- Country: Canada
- Territories: Northwest Territories; Yukon
- Climate type: Subarctic

The Taiga Cordillera Ecozone, as defined by the Commission for Environmental Cooperation (CEC), is a rugged, mountainous terrestrial ecozone of Canada spanning most of northern Yukon and significant portions of the border between the Yukon and the Northwest Territories.

This ecozone is very sparsely populated, with only a few hundred inhabitants who rely on subsistence living and the tourism industry. Most of the area's population consists of members of the Vuntut Gwitchin First Nation in the community of Old Crow, located on the Porcupine River.

== Geography ==
To the south is the Boreal Cordillera, to the east are the Taiga Plains, and its northern extent is defined by Yukon's coastline, at which it abuts the Southern Arctic ecozone.

The northernmost area is an arctic tundra which is beyond the tree line, so is characterised by small plants and shrubs. These transition to alpine tundra and lowland taiga in a southeastern arc across the zone. To the northwest are rolling hills, throughout which are found broad wetlands reaching the coast of the Beaufort Sea. The interior, comprising the Selwyn Mountains and Mackenzie Mountains, is primarily steep, mountainous terrain with sharp, narrow valleys.

=== Ecoprovinces ===
This ecozone can be further subdivided into four ecoprovinces:

- Mackenzie-Selwyn Mountains
- Northern Yukon Mountains
- Ogilvie Mountains
- Old Crow-Eagle Plains

== Climate ==
With mountains blocking the passage of moisture-laden air masses into the region, typical annual precipitation averages 250 to 300 mm throughout the ecozone, resulting in a dry climate. Winters are long, dark and extremely cold, with mean January temperatures between -25 and -30 °C. Summers are short and cool, with mean July temperatures between 12 and 15 °C. Snow cover lasts a minimum of six months a year, and may persist up to eight months.

== Conservation ==
The area includes three national parks within its boundaries - Ivvavik National Park, Vuntut National Park, and Nahanni National Park Reserve, one of twelve sites in the first group of World Heritage Sites granted by UNESCO. It also contains Old Crow Flats, an internationally important wetland that overlaps Vuntut National Park.
