= Taiga Shield Ecozone =

Ecosystem in Canada

Taiga Shield
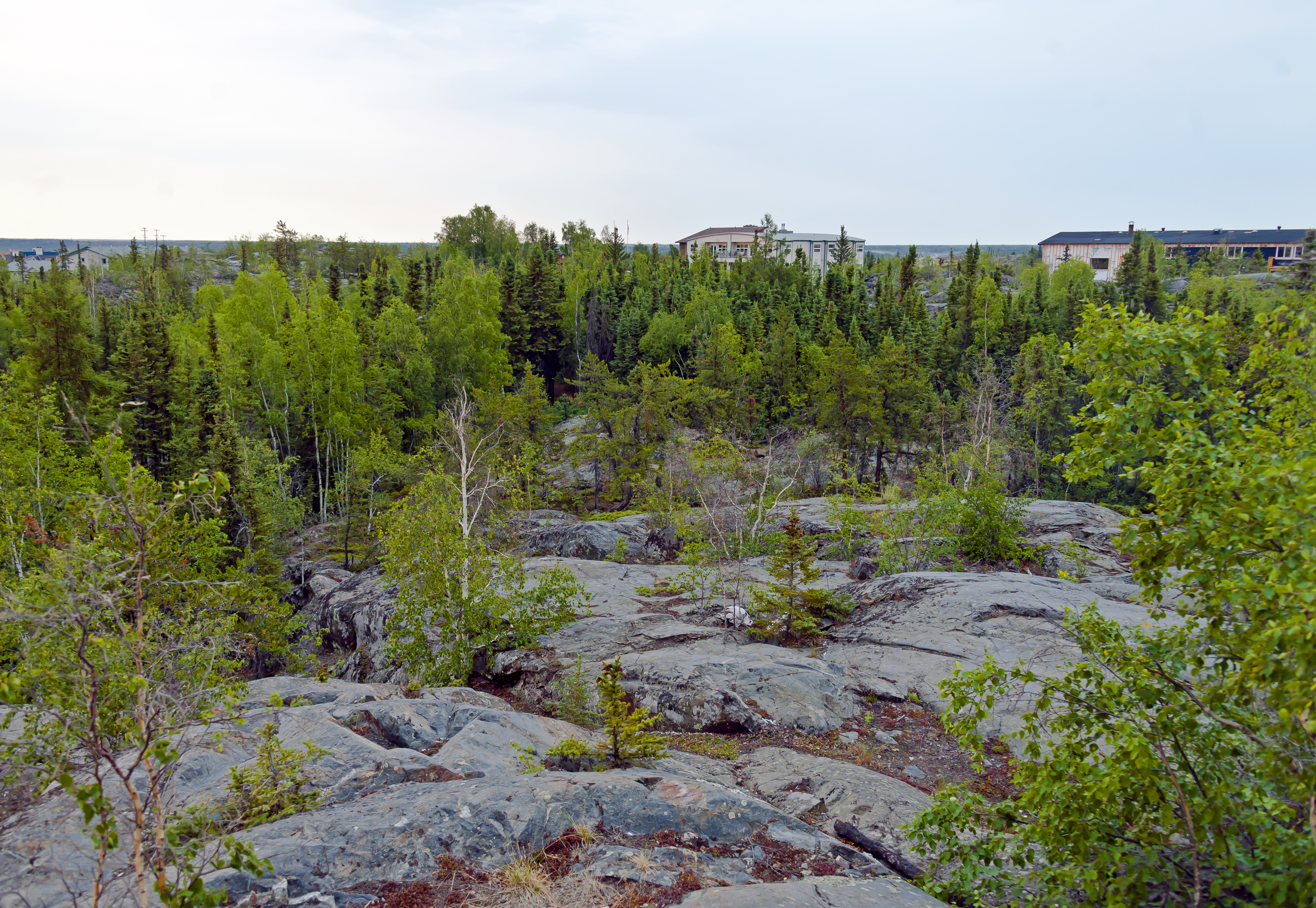
- Tazin Lake Upland ecoregion of the Taiga Shield

Ecology
- Borders: List: Arctic Cordillera; Boreal Shield; Boreal Plains; Hudson Plains; Southern Arctic; Taiga Plains

Geography
- Area: 1,381,821 km^{2} (533,524 mi^{2})
- Country: Canada
- Provinces: Alberta; Manitoba; Newfoundland and Labrador; Northwest Territories; Nunavut; Quebec; Saskatchewan
- Climate type: Subarctic

The Taiga Shield Ecozone, as defined by the Commission for Environmental Cooperation (CEC), is an ecozone which stretches across Canada's subarctic region. Some regions exhibit exposed Precambrian bedrock of the Canadian Shield, the oldest of the world's geological formations. The world's oldest rocks, dating to four billion years, are found in the Canadian Shield north of Great Slave Lake.

== Geography ==
The Taiga Shield ecozone covers almost all of the eastern area of the Northwest Territories, a tiny corner of northeastern Alberta, a narrow strip of all northern Saskatchewan and northwestern Manitoba, as well as all some parts of southern Nunavut. Here, it is interrupted by the Hudson Bay, where it abuts with the marine ecozone of the Arctic Archipelago Marine, and resumes on the eastern shores of Hudson Bay on the coast of Quebec, where it continues in a consistently-wide strip towards the ocean, encompassing all but a small portion of Labrador. It is one of the largest ecozones in Canada, covering 1.3 million square kilometres.

Terrain is typically flat or rolling hills with thousands of depressions carved by glacial retreat now infilled, forming lakes, ponds, wetlands and other water features. Long eskers and uplands are also common.

=== Ecoprovinces ===
This ecozone can be further subdivided into four ecoprovinces:

- Eastern Taiga
- Labrador Uplands
- Western Taiga Shield
- Whale River Lowland

== Settlements ==
Primarily wilderness, the Taiga Shield is sparsely populated, with approximately 340,000 inhabitants, over 60% of which is First Nations. Most settled areas developed around mining or hydroelectric activity, for example in Yellowknife and Uranium City in the west and Labrador City in the east, but are isolated from other communities. Mineral extraction is the most important economic activity, with iron being mined in Quebec and Labrador, uranium in Saskatchewan, and gold and more recently diamonds in the Northwest Territories.

== Climate ==
This subarctic zone experiences cool summers that are short, with at least 24 hours of full daylight a year in its most northern reaches, and winters that are extremely cold and long, with at least one 24-hour period of complete darkness. Precipitation ranges from 250 to 500 mm (10-20 in.) annually throughout the zone, except in Labrador which may receive up to 800 mm (31 in.) along its coast, and typically increases from west to east.

The shallow soils remain damp, even soggy, year-round, and regularly freeze and thaw without drainage. This leads to shifting soil that randomly tilts growing trees, which has been likened to a "drunken forest".

== Conservation ==
A number of protected areas have been established to protect representative and/or significant portions of this ecozone. These include Caribou River Wilderness Provincial Park, Sand Lakes Provincial Park, and Thaidene Nëné National Park Reserve.
