= Ecozones of Canada =

Canada has 20 major ecosystems—ecozones, comprising 15 terrestrial units and 5 marine units. These ecozones are further subdivided into 53 ecoprovinces, 194 ecoregions, and 1,027 ecodistricts. These form the country's ecological land classification within the Ecological Land Classification framework adopted in 2017. They represent areas of the Earth's surface representative of large and very generalized ecological units characterized by interactive and adjusting biotic and abiotic factors.

== Terrestrial ecozones ==
On November 20, 2017, Statistics Canada approved the Ecological Land Classification (ELC) framework as the official government standard in classifying the ecological regions of Canada. This framework mirrors that which was originally established in 1995, but revises number of ecodistricts to 1,027 in order to better align them with the Soil Landscapes of Canada (SLC) database of Agriculture and Agri-Food Canada. Though this framework originally included 5 marine ecozones, these were never formally adopted by Statistics Canada. It is based on a hierarchy with ecosystems nested within ecosystems. The Ecological Framework for Canada defines four levels of ecosystems as a nested hierarchy of areas:

- Ecozones
- Ecoprovinces
- Ecoregions
- Ecodistricts

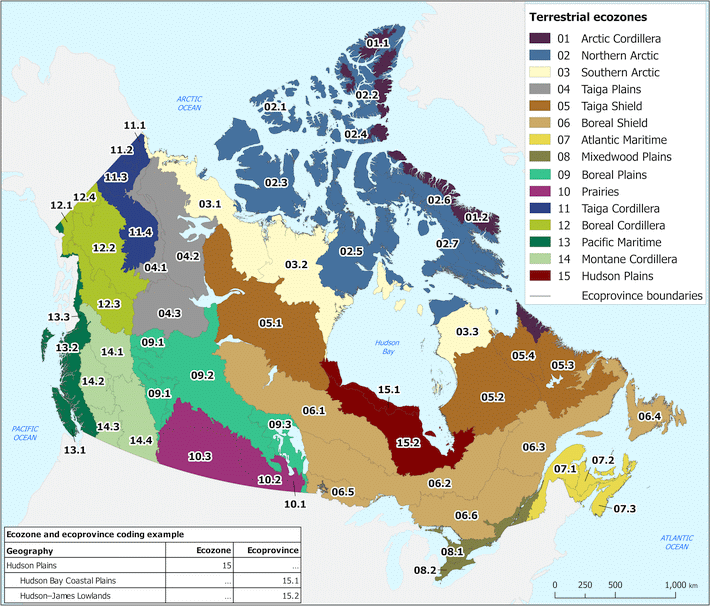
ELC Ecozones and ecoprovinces of Canada

ID	Ecozone	Total area (km²)
01	Arctic Cordillera	242,190
02	Northern Arctic	1,507,872
03	Southern Arctic	839,760
04	Taiga Plains	652,125
05	Taiga Shield	1,381,821
06	Boreal Shield	1,937,517
07	Atlantic Maritime	213,863
08	Mixedwood Plains	168,204
09	Boreal Plains	737,287
10	Prairies	465,094
11	Taiga Cordillera	265,375
12	Boreal Cordillera	467,870
13	Pacific Maritime	207,925
14	Montane Cordillera	487,896
15	Hudson Plains	373,718
Total		9,948,517

== Marine ecozones ==
Canada is divided into 5 marine ecozones based upon the National Ecological Framework for Canada established by the Ecological Stratification Working Group in 1995 in accordance with the requirements of the CEC. The Canadian marine ecozones adjoin to each other, except for the Pacific ecozone which is adjacent to international marine ecozones and terrestrial Canadian ecozones. The largest is the Arctic Archipelago, which actually extends to subarctic regions.

Ecozone	Area (km²) Territorial waters	Area (km²) Exclusive Economic Zone	Percentage of total area (for EEZ)	Percentage of marine area (for EEZ)
Pacific Marine	102,920	457,646	3.1	8.3
Arctic Basin Marine	24,997	704,849	4.8	12.7
Arctic Archipelago Marine	2,051,393	2,178,998	14.8	39.3
Northwest Atlantic Marine	536,895	1,205,981	8.2	21.8
Atlantic Marine	72,144	996,439	6.8	17.9
Total	2,788,349	5,543,913	37.7	100.0

== History ==
=== Ecological Framework of Canada 1995 ===
In 1991, a collaborative project was undertaken by a number of federal agencies in cooperation with provincial and territorial governments to establish a common ecological framework for Canada. The resulting report, A National Ecological Framework for Canada, released by the Ecological Stratification Working Group in 1995, established the 20 ecozones (15 terrestrial and 5 marine), 194 ecoregions, and 1,031 ecodistricts of Canada. A second report published in 1999 established the 53 ecoprovinces of Canada in accordance with the requirements of the Commission for Environmental Cooperation (CEC).

=== Further developments ===
In 2009, Fisheries and Oceans Canada developed the 13 federal marine bioregions of Canada as the official spatial planning framework in classifying and preserving the ecological integrity of Canada's internal waters and exclusive economic zone.

In 2010, Environment Canada published the report Canadian Biodiversity: Ecosystem Status and Trends 2010 utilizing a modified hierarchy called "Ecozone+". Major modifications included adjustments to terrestrial boundaries to reflect improvements in ground truthing, the combining of three Arctic ecozones, and the addition of two ecoprovinces (Western Interior Basin and Newfoundland Boreal) and nine marine ecosystem-based units.

=== Canadian Ecological Framework 2014 ===
In 2014, the Canadian Council on Ecological Areas (CCEA) released an update to the first digital version of the Canadian Ecological Framework (CEF). The new spatial framework was designed to replace the 1995 ecological framework as well as the Ecozone+ framework used in the Canadian Biodiversity: Ecosystem Status and Trends 2010 Report. This new ecozone map includes 18 terrestrial, 12 marine and 1 freshwater ecozone, the latter two of which were derived from the marine bioregions outlined by Fisheries and Oceans Canada in 2009.

This comprehensive framework is currently in use by Environment and Climate Change Canada to determine protected area coverage of Canada's ecozones.

ID	Ecozone	Total area (km²)	Percent protected (2019)
CL01	Arctic Cordillera	233,619	22.5
CL02	Northern Arctic	1,481,481	7.1
CL03	Southern Arctic	957,139	17.1
CL04	Taiga Plains	554,013	10.9
CL05	Taiga Shield	1,322,786	10.0
CL06	Boreal Shield	1,897,364	9.9
CL07	Atlantic Maritime	110,590	8.5
CL08	Mixedwood Plains	116,206	2.0
CL09	Boreal Plains	779,471	8.7
CL10	Prairies	465,990	6.0
CL11	Montane Cordillera	437,761	18.8
CL12	Pacific Maritime	216,942	24.2
CL13	Boreal Cordillera	557,937	17.3
CL14	Taiga Cordillera	231,161	9.3
CL15	Hudson Plains	350,693	12.5
CL16	Tundra Cordillera	28,980	24.6
CL17	Atlantic Highlands	93,017	4.1
CL18	Semi-Arid Plateaus	56,434	9.4
CW19	Strait of Georgia	8,969	4.7
CW20	Southern Shelf	28,158	2.8
CW21	Offshore Pacific	315,724	3.3
CW22	Northern Shelf	101,663	16.4
CW23	Arctic Basin	752,053	37.8
CW24	Western Arctic	539,807	2.2
CW25	Arctic Archipelago	268,792	14.5
CW26	Eastern Arctic	782,636	14.7
CW27	Hudson Bay Complex	1,244,670	0.7
CW28	Newfoundland-Labrador Shelves	1,041,588	1.2
CW29	Scotian Shelf	416,296	1.4
CW30	Gulf of Saint Lawrence	246,648	2.4
CW31	Great Lakes	88,250	13.5
Total (land)		9,891,584	11.3

== See also ==
- List of ecoregions in North America (CEC)
- List of ecoregions in the United States (EPA)
- Forests of Canada § Regions
