= Marine Protected Areas of Canada =

Zones within Canadian waters

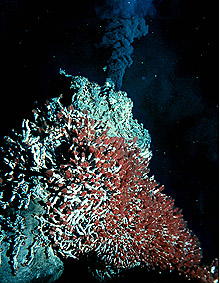
The Endeavour Hydrothermal Vents were designated as the first Marine Protected Area of Canada in 2003.

Marine Protected Areas (MPAs) (French: zones de protection marine) are zones within Canadian waters where the marine environment receives a high level of environmental protection. Marine Protected Areas are governed by the Oceans Act of 1996 and administered by Fisheries and Oceans Canada. The federal government of Canada has committed to protecting 25% of its oceans as Marine Protected Areas by the year 2025, and a further 5% (30% of the ocean area of the Exclusive Economic Zone) by 2030.

== Scope of protection ==
On 25 April 2019, new standards were adopted for marine protected areas that prohibit four industrial activities: oil and gas activities, mining, dumping, and bottom trawling. These standards do not retroactively void existing oil and gas licenses, or void previously approved bottom trawling activities. Instead, the department will assess each issue of these now prohibited activities on a case-by-case basis to ensure they're in line with the conservation objectives of the specific area. However, designation as a Marine Protected Area does not automatically prohibit fishing and other activities. Activities within these areas are assessed on a case-by-case basis and are permitted if they are consistent with the conservation objectives of the specific area.

== Adding to the system ==
Fisheries and Oceans Canada collaborates with interested and affected parties to provide input into the establishment of a marine protected area. When an area is under consideration to become a marine protected area, it is identified as an Area of Interest. If further study is required to develop an appropriate long-term conservation approach, it is identified as a Study Area.

The department determines the viability of a proposal based upon the ecological, biophysical, social, cultural, and economic aspects of the area. Based on the overview and assessment reports, the conservation objectives of the proposed MPA are elaborated upon and the regulatory measures are developed. The proposal is then published in Canada Gazette, Part I for public comment, at which point regulations may be modified to reflect comments received. Once finalized, official MPA designation occurs when its regulations are published in Canada Gazette, Part II.

== List of Marine Protected Areas ==
As of May 2026, Canada has sixteen Marine Protected Areas (MPAs) covering an area of over 600,000 km^{2} (230,000 sq mi), or about 10% of Canada’s marine and coastal areas. The former Endeavour Hydrothermal Vents MPA was repealed in 2024 with the establishment of Tang.ɢ̱wan – ḥačxwiqak – Tsig̱is Marine Protected Area, which includes the Endeavour Hydrothermal Vents within its boundaries.

Name	Location	Established	Area (km^{2})	Natural region	Description
Anguniaqvia niqiqyuam	Northwest Territories	2016	2,358	Western Arctic	Protects ecologically important habitats for Arctic char, cod, beluga and bowhead whales, ringed and bearded seals, polar bears, and numerous sea birds.
Banc-des-Américains	Quebec	2019	1,000	Estuary and Gulf of Saint Lawrence	Protects the benthic and pelagic ecosystems of an underwater ridge extending southeast from Cap Gaspé.
Basin Head	Prince Edward Island	2005	9	Estuary and Gulf of Saint Lawrence	Protects an underwater ecosystem supporting Irish moss.
Eastport	Newfoundland and Labrador	2005	2	Newfoundland-Labrador Shelves	Protects two areas of high biological productivity and prime lobster habitat around Eastport Peninsula.
Gilbert Bay	Newfoundland and Labrador	2005	60	Newfoundland-Labrador Shelves	Protects a genetically unique resident population of Atlantic cod known as "Gilbert Bay cod".
The Gully	Nova Scotia	2004	2,363	Scotian Shelf	Protects a deep submarine canyon ecosystem and endangered cetacean populations in the area.
Hecate Strait and Queen Charlotte Sound Glass Sponge Reefs	British Columbia	2017	2,410	Northern Shelf	Protects four glass sponge reefs that were the first discovered living specimens and are the largest glass sponge reefs in the world.
Laurentian Channel	Newfoundland and Labrador	2019	11,580	Newfoundland-Labrador Shelves	Protects a variety of endangered species within the channel.
Musquash Estuary	New Brunswick	2006	7	Scotian Shelf	Protects the largest ecologically-intact salt marsh in the Bay of Fundy.
Qikiqtait	Nunavut	2026	42,700	Hudson Complex	Protects the waters surrounding the Belcher Islands of southeastern Hudson Bay.
Saint Anns Bank	Nova Scotia	2017	4,364	Scotian Shelf	Protects a region of high biodiversity and biological productivity off the east coast of Cape Breton Island.
Sarvarjuaq	Nunavut	2026	73,700	Arctic Archipelago	Protects the portion of the North Water Polynya within Canada's Exclusive Economic Zone.
SG̲áan K̲ínghlas-Bowie Seamount	British Columbia	2008	6,103	Offshore Pacific	Protects a unique, biologically diverse marine community of deep sea, subtidal, and intertidal species.
Tang.ɢ̱wan – ḥačxwiqak – Tsig̱is	British Columbia	2024	133,017	Offshore Pacific	Protects all known hydrothermal vent fields within Canada and 47 seamounts.
Tarium Niryutait	Northwest Territories; Yukon	2010	1,750	Western Arctic	Protects a dynamic, highly productive, and biologically diverse marine ecosystem located within the outer reaches of the Mackenzie River delta.
Tuvaijuittuq	Nunavut	2019	319,411	Arctic Basin and Arctic Archipelago	Protects a diverse marine ecosystem dependent on thick, multi-year pack ice created by the circulation of the Beaufort Gyre.

=== Areas of Interest ===
Name	Location	Area (km^{2})	Natural region	Description
Eastern Shore Islands	Nova Scotia	2,000	Scotian Shelf	A large, highly productive, and ecologically intact stretch of coastline between the villages of Marie Joseph and Jeddore.
Fundian Channel-Browns Bank	Nova Scotia	7,200	Scotian Shelf	Area hosting diverse benthic habitats and depleted fish species.
Northern Gulf of St. Lawrence	Quebec	TBD	Estuary and Gulf of Saint Lawrence	
Race Rocks (XwaYeN)	British Columbia	2	Southern Shelf	
St. Lawrence Estuary	Quebec	6,000	Estuary and Gulf of Saint Lawrence	Currently undergoing additional studies to develop an appropriate long-term conservation approach.
Shediac Valley	New Brunswick; Prince Edward Island	1,530	Estuary and Gulf of Saint Lawrence	Area of high biological productivity and a key habitat for various fish species.
Southampton Island	Nunavut	93,087	Hudson Complex	Area of high biological productivity.

== See also ==
- National Marine Conservation Area
