= Tarium Niryutait Marine Protected Area =

Canadian Arctic Marine Protected Area

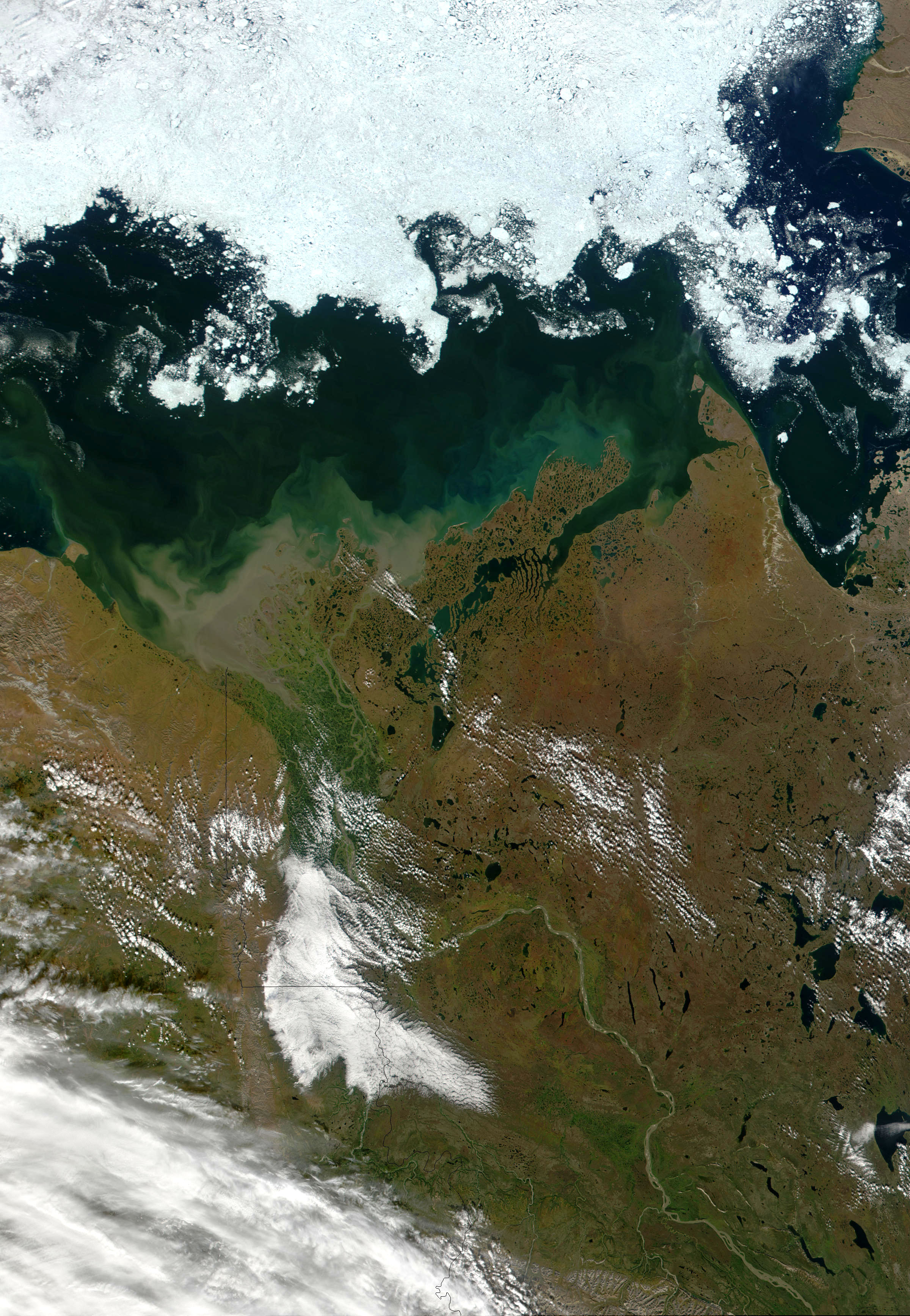
- Satellite image of the Mackenzie Delta area where the Tarium Niryutait MPA is located

- Location within Northwest Territories Location within Canada
- Location: Inuvialuit Settlement Region, Northwest Territories/Yukon, Canada
- Nearest city: Tuktoyaktuk (hamlet); Inuvik; Aklavik (hamlet)
- Coordinates: 69.349363°N 135.263777°W
- Area: 1,750 km^{2} (680 sq mi)
- Designation: Marine Protected Area
- Established: August 2010
- Governing body: Fisheries and Oceans Canada

Tarium Niryutait is a marine protected area (MPA) located in the coastal areas of the Yukon and Northwest Territories in Canada. It is located within the Inuvialuit Settlement Region and was the first Arctic MPA established in Canada. The MPA was established with the goal of protecting Beluga whales and the biodiversity of other bird and fish species and their habitats.

== Geography ==
Tarium Niryutait is divided into three sections adjacent to the Mackenzie Delta that together cover an area of 1,750 square kilometres (680 mi^{2}):

- Niaqunnaq (Shallow Bay) is located on the western side of the Mackenzie Delta containing part of Mackenzie Bay,
- Okeevik (East Mackenzie Bay), the most northern area, encompasses a triangular region between Pelly Island, Garry Island and Kendall Island, adjacent to the Kendall Island Migratory Bird Sanctuary, and,
- Kittigaryuit (Kugmallit Bay), the easternmost region, is located to the west of the hamlet of Tuktoyaktuk, and surrounds Hendrickson Island. It is also located near the Pingo National Landmark.

These areas are very shallow and heavily influenced by the Mackenzie River during summer, and seasonal land-fast sea ice. The regions lie adjacent to seasonal stamukhi zone which impounds the Mackenzie River during the winter and spring.

== Ecology ==
The area is an important summer habitat of the Eastern Beaufort Sea Beluga population. The whales return annually in June once the sea-ice has broken up and remain until September. Other mammals observed in the area include bowhead whales, polar bears and ringed seals.

Notable fish species that occur in the region include Pacific herring, Dolly Varden, broad whitefish, and Arctic cisco, among others.

The Tarium Niryutait MPA area is also used by many important waterfowl throughout their life cycles. For example, ice edges are frequented by the Ivory gull, which is endangered in Canada.

== See also ==
- Anguniaqvia niqiqyuam Marine Protected Area
- Tuvaijuittuq Marine Protected Area
- Marine Protected Areas of Canada
