= National Marine Conservation Area =

Marine protected areas of Canada prioritizing sustainability and ecological protection

National Marine Conservation Areas (NMCAs) is a Parks Canada programme responsible for marine areas managed for sustainability and containing smaller zones of high protection. They include the seabed, the water itself and any species which occur there. They may also include wetlands, estuaries, islands and other coastal lands. They are protected from dumping, undersea mining, as well as oil and gas exploration and development, which may damage the aquatic or terrestrial ecosystems in the conservation area. However, not all commercial activities are prohibited in these zones. Shipping, commercial and sport fishing, and recreational activities are allowed.

== Marine conservation at Nature Canada ==
In 1996, Nature Canada developed its Marine Conservation Program in recognition that marine ecosystems were as affected by human activity as terrestrial ecosystems. At that time, Canada National Parks Act was designed to guide conservation and protection only on land. So that year, Nature Canada began advocating for new legislation that would enable the creation of national marine conservation areas. The Marine Conservation Area Act was passed to address those concerns.

== List of National Marine Conservation Areas ==
As of 2020, established NMCAs and NMCA Reserves protect 14,846 km^{2} (5,732 sq mi) of waters, wetlands, and coastlines, representing five of the 29 identified marine regions with studies underway for protected areas in three additional regions.

† UNESCO Biosphere Reserve

Name	Photo	Location	Established	Area (2017)	Marine region	Description
Fathom Five National Marine Park †		Ontario; 45°19′N 81°38′W	20 July 1987	114 km^{2} (44 sq mi)	Georgian Bay	The marine counterpart to the adjacent Bruce Peninsula National Park, Fathom Five is named for a line in Shakespeare's The Tempest. The first marine unit in the national parks system preserves a unique aquatic environment and several small islands including Flowerpot Island. The unusually clear waters and numerous shipwrecks on the shoals of Georgian Bay make the park a popular destination for scuba divers.
Gwaii Haanas NMCA Reserve & Haida Heritage Site (Reserve)		British Columbia; 52°0′N 131°12′W	11 June 2010	1,500 km^{2} (579 sq mi)	Hecate Strait, Queen Charlotte Shelf	Along with the National Park Reserve of the same name, Gwaii Haanas protects an area extending from the ocean floor of the Hecate Strait and Queen Charlotte Basin to the mountains of the Haida Gwaii. The marine reserve preserves the Haida people's traditional use of the waters while protecting the area from oil exploration and commercial fishing. As a Reserve, it is a proposed NMCA, pending settlement of Native claims, but managed as a park unit in the interim.
Lake Superior NMCA		Ontario; 48°26′N 89°13′W	1 September 2015	10,880 km^{2} (4,201 sq mi)	Lake Superior	Adjacent to the United States' Isle Royale National Park and several Ontario provincial parks, Lake Superior NMCA forms part of the world's largest freshwater reserve.
Saguenay–St. Lawrence Marine Park†		Quebec; 48°4′N 69°40′W	8 June 1998	1,245 km^{2} (481 sq mi)	St. Lawrence Estuary	Located at the confluence of the Saguenay and St. Lawrence rivers and adjacent to Quebec's "Saguenay Fjord National Park" (a provincial park), Saguenay–St. Lawrence protects a portion of the St. Lawrence estuary, a common feeding ground for marine mammals such as the endangered St. Lawrence beluga whale.

=== Proposed National Marine Conservation Areas ===
Study area	Location	Area	Marine region
Magdalen Islands	Quebec; 47°35′N 61°32′W	16,500 km^{2} (6,371 sq mi)	Magdalen shallows
Southern Strait of Georgia (Reserve)	British Columbia; 49°18′N 123°48′W	1,400 km^{2} (541 sq mi)	Strait of Georgia
Tallurutiup Imanga	Nunavut; 74°13′N 84°0′W	109,000 km^{2} (42,085 sq mi)	Lancaster Sound
Central coast of BC (Reserve)	British Columbia; 52.137432°N 128.766589°W	14,200 km^{2} (5,483 sq mi)	Queen Charlotte Sound
Northern coast of Labrador (next to Torngat Mountains National Park)	Newfoundland and Labrador; 59.529316°N 63.400407°W	14,906 km^{2} (5,755 sq mi)	Labrador Shelf
Eastern James Bay (Eeyou Istchee)	Nunavut Quebec; 52.667895°N 79.395118°W	28,000 km^{2} (10,811 sq mi)	James Bay
Western James Bay & Southwestern Hudson Bay	Ontario Nunavut; 55.440044°N 82.131535°W	91,000 km^{2} (35,135 sq mi)	James Bay and Hudson Bay
Tuvaijuittuq	Nunavut; 82.837637°N 91.663637°W	319,411 km^{2} (123,325 sq mi)	Arctic Basin and Arctic Archipelago

== See also ==
- List of national parks of Canada
- National Parks of Canada
- Marine Protected Areas of Canada
