= Anguniaqvia niqiqyuam Marine Protected Area =

Marine protected area in Canada

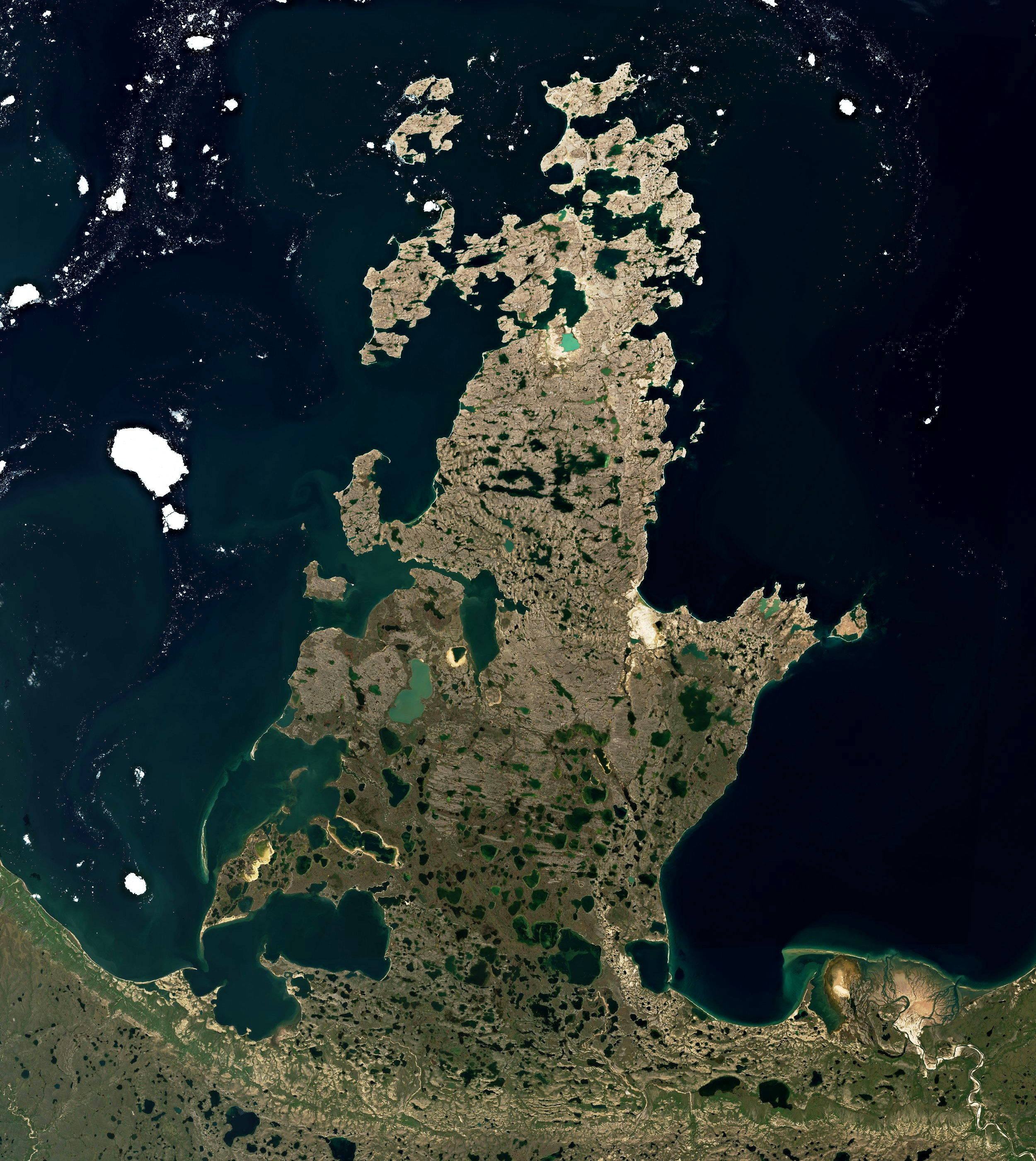
- A satellite image of Parry Peninsula; the marine protected area extends around its northern and eastern sides.

- Location within Northwest Territories Location within Canada
- Location: Inuvialuit Settlement Region, Northwest Territories, Canada
- Nearest city: Paulatuk (hamlet)
- Coordinates: 70.086304°N 124.666058°W
- Area: 2,358 km^{2} (910 sq mi)
- Designation: Marine Protected Area
- Established: October 2016
- Governing body: Fisheries and Oceans Canada

The Anguniaqvia niqiqyuam Marine Protected Area (MPA) is located in the Inuvialuit Settlement Region in the Northwest Territories, Canada. The MPA was established in October 2016 to support habitat for important marine species, and to help protect the marine environment adjacent to the Cape Parry Migratory Bird Sanctuary. The area is culturally important to the Inuvialuit for subsistence hunting and fishing activities. The MPA was named in honour of Nelson Green, an Inuvialuk elder from Paulatuk.

== Geography ==
Anguniaqvia niqiqyuam lies adjacent to the hamlet of Paulatuk, and surrounds much of Parry Peninsula. Cape Parry is located at the tip of the peninsula, where a migratory bird sanctuary is located. Franklin Bay lies on the western side of the MPA, and on the eastern side of the peninsula the MPA extends south into Darnley Bay. Rivers located nearby include the Hornaday and Brock Rivers, which empty into Darnley Bay, and the Horton River (Canada) which enters the ocean on the western side of Franklin Bay, from the eastern coast of the Bathurst Peninsula.

The MPA is situated along the southern coast of Amundsen Gulf and covers an area of approximately 2,358 square kilometres (910 sq mi). Tuktut Nogait National Park is located nearby.

== Ecology ==
Anguniaqvia niqiqyuam MPA encompasses important habitats for numerous species including Arctic char, Beluga whales, Bowhead whales, ringed and bearded seals, and polar bear.

The MPA surrounds the Cape Parry Migratory Bird Sanctuary, which was established to protect nesting thick-billed murres and black guillemots. At least 20 other bird species have been noted in this sanctuary, which further provides critical staging habitat for migrating waterfowl.

== See also ==
- Tarium Niryutait Marine Protected Area
- Tuvaijuittuq Marine Protected Area
- Marine Protected Areas of Canada

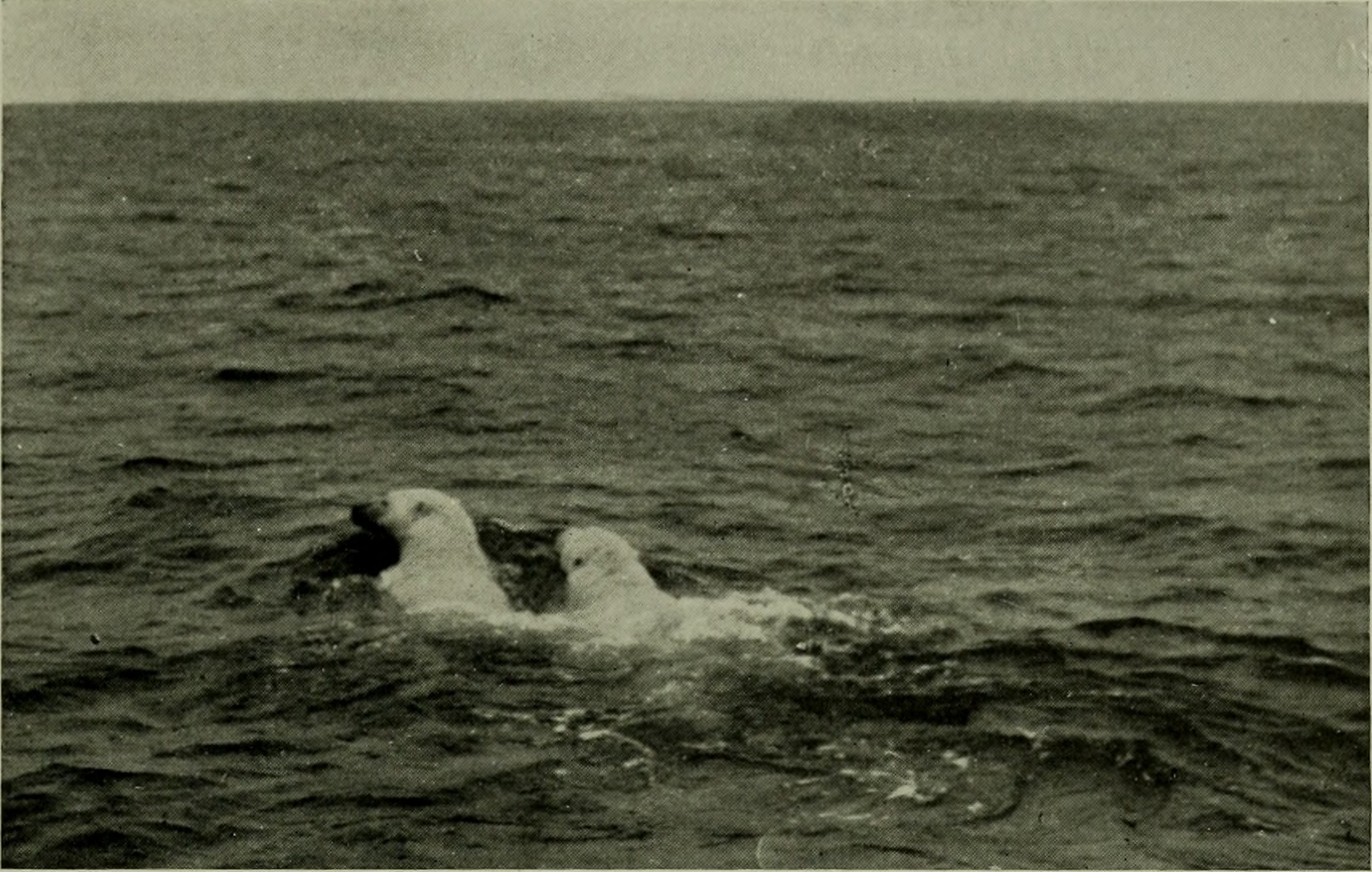
Polar bears swimming near Cape Parry, 1913
