= Gwaii Haanas National Marine Conservation Area Reserve and Haida Heritage Site =

National marine conservation area and heritage site in British Columbia, Canada

Gwaii Haanas National Marine Conservation Area
- IUCN category VI (protected area with sustainable use of natural resources)
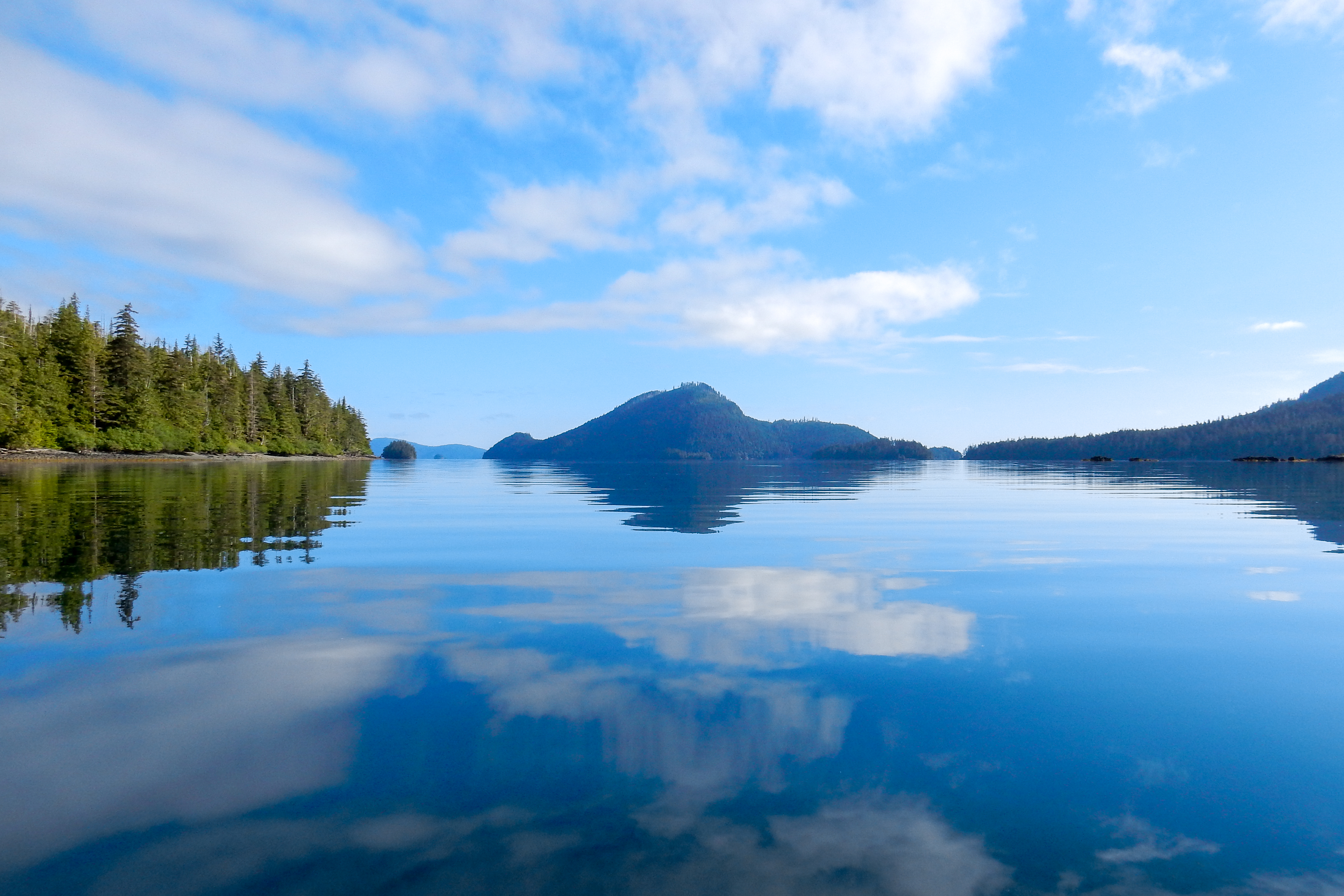

- Location within Canada Location within British Columbia
- Location: Haida Gwaii (formerly Queen Charlotte Islands), British Columbia, Canada
- Nearest city: Sandspit
- Coordinates: 52°00′00″N 131°12′00″W
- Area: 1,500 km^{2} (580 sq mi)
- Established: 11 June 2010
- Governing body: Parks Canada, Council of the Haida Nation and Fisheries and Oceans Canada

Gwaii Haanas National Marine Conservation Area Reserve and Haida Heritage Site is a National Marine Conservation Area of Canada. It is located off the coast of the southernmost Haida Gwaii (formerly known as the Queen Charlotte Islands), 130 kilometres off the mainland of British Columbia. It is immediately adjacent to Gwaii Haanas National Park Reserve and Haida Heritage Site. The level of protection differs from that of the National Park Reserve, however, allowing sustainable use of some natural resources in the area. Gwaii Haanas National Marine Conservation Area Reserve, which covers 3,400 square kilometres, is "a primary feeding habitat" of the humpback whale (North Pacific population) protected by Canada's Species at Risk Act (SARA). (Note: In 2008 there were approximately 18,302 humpback whales in the entire North Pacific basin (SPLASH 2008:2-3). There were 9,819 in 1992. In 2005 the humpback whale (North Pacific population) was listed as threatened under Canada's Species at Risk Act (SARA) but its status was downgraded from "threatened" to "species of special concern" on April 19, 2014.)

== Establishment ==
Local information sessions and consultation with stakeholders (commercial fishers, tour companies, the Haida, and local residents) began in 2007. In June, 2010, the Canadian parliament formally approved the creation of Gwaii Haanas NMCA Reserve.

The park's establishment was celebrated in a ceremony held at the Haida Heritage Centre in Skidegate, British Columbia, on June 13, 2010. Canada's Environment Minister, Jim Prentice, and Guujaaw, the President of the Council of the Haida Nation, both spoke at the ceremony.

== See also ==
- List of national parks of Canada
