= Scotian Shelf =

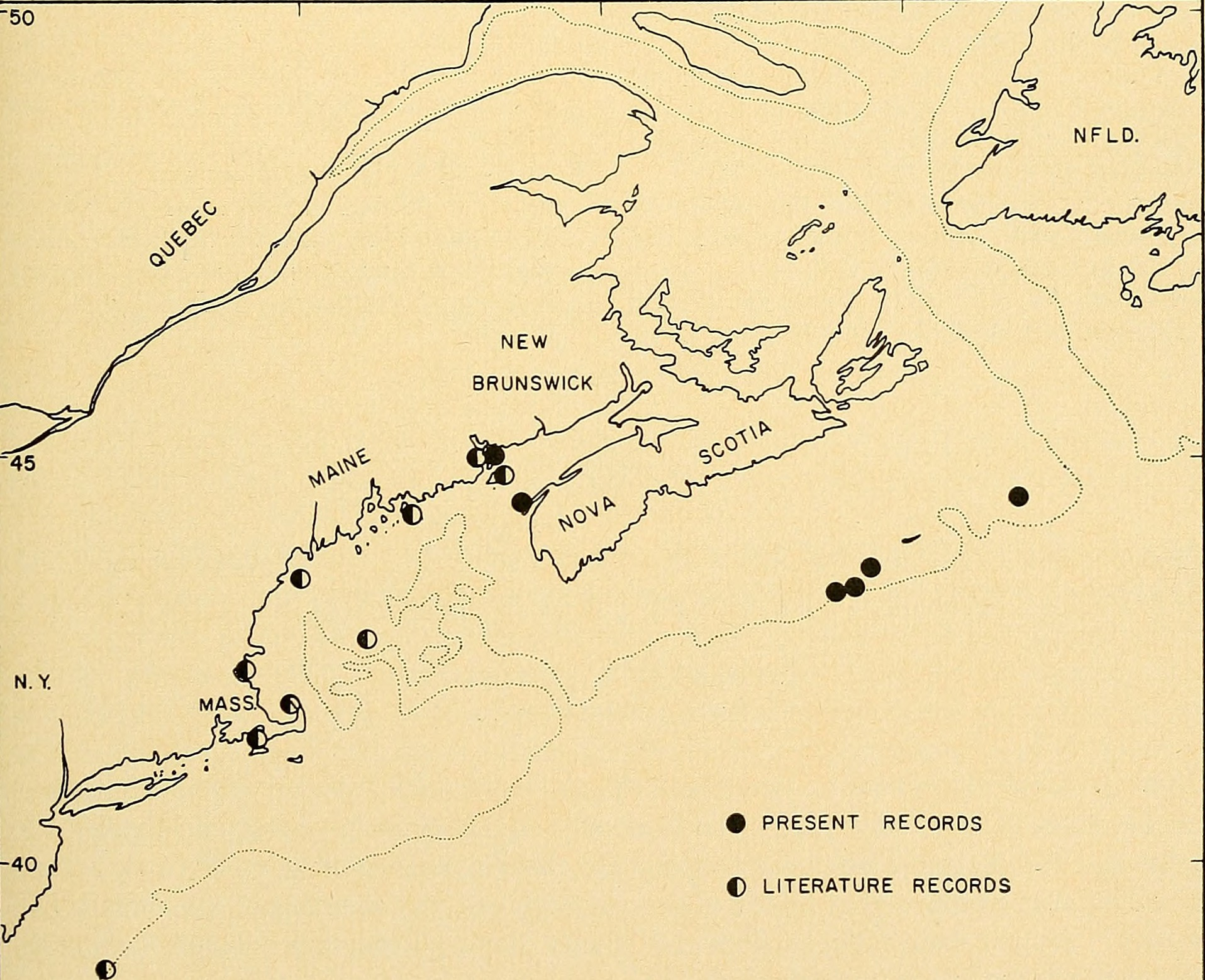
The Scotian Shelf

The Scotian Shelf is a geological formation that is part of the continental shelf southwest of Nova Scotia, Canada. It covers an area of 120,000 square kilometres (46,000 sq mi), is 700 kilometres (430 mi) long, and has a width from 120 to 240 kilometres (75 to 149 mi). It has an average depth of 90 metres (300 ft). The Scotian Shelf contains the ecologically important Scotian Shelf Large Marine Ecosystem (LME) and the Scotian Shelf Waters (SSW).

The northeastern boundary is defined by the Laurentian Channel, where it drops off to 400 metres (1,300 ft). Further south is the continental slope, which sharply drops off to a depth of more than 3,000 metres (9,800 ft). The southwestern boundary ends at the Northeast Channel, including the Gulf of Maine.

The Scotian Shelf is characterized by shallow offshore banks 25 to 100 metres (82 to 328 ft) under the ocean surface, with deep basins and troughs between that vary in depth from 160 to 300 metres (520 to 980 ft). They culminate at Sable Island.

A southwesterly ocean current, occasionally containing runoff from the Gulf of St Lawrence, flows over the inner shelf. The water flow over the banks is weaker and tends have greater variation. The Scotian Shelf contains a canyon called the "Gully", which is more than 1,000 metres (3,300 ft) deep. Currents flow through the canyon southward and mix offshore waters with the Nova Scotia Current. That causes an increase in biological productivity toward the east, across the Continental Shelf and contains body parts from multiple decades of animals.

The Scotian Shelf is heavily influenced by the Gulf Stream, resulting in a variety of marine species that are normally found farther south. They appear at regular intervals because the main current spins off cores of warm water.

== Marine life ==
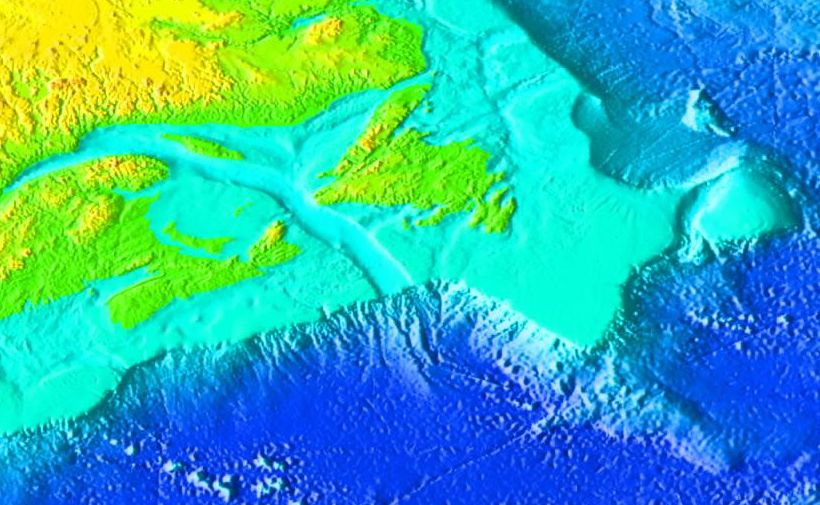
Bathymetry near the Gulf of Saint Lawrence, including the Scotian Shelf.

The Scotian Shelf Large Marine Ecosystem (LME) contains numerous species, including a broad range of shellfish and fishes that use the area as spawning and nursery grounds. The abundance causes the Scotian Shelf to be one of the Atlantic Ocean's most fished areas.

The right whale has a critical habitat in the Roseway Basin, the northeastern part of the Scotian Shelf. Approximately 30 percent of the known population uses this habitat throughout the course of the year.

The northern bottlenose whale also lives in the Scotian Shelf Waters area, particularly the Gully. About 230 individual specimens have been recorded there. Other species, such as the sperm whale and harbour seal, are also found in the region, including the grey seal, which is common on Sable Island.

Various waterfowl use the coastal areas as a migratory staging area. Offshore areas are used by such birds as shearwaters, sea ducks like the common eider, and alcids like dovekies and murres.
