= Tuvaijuittuq Marine Protected Area =

Nature reserve in Canada

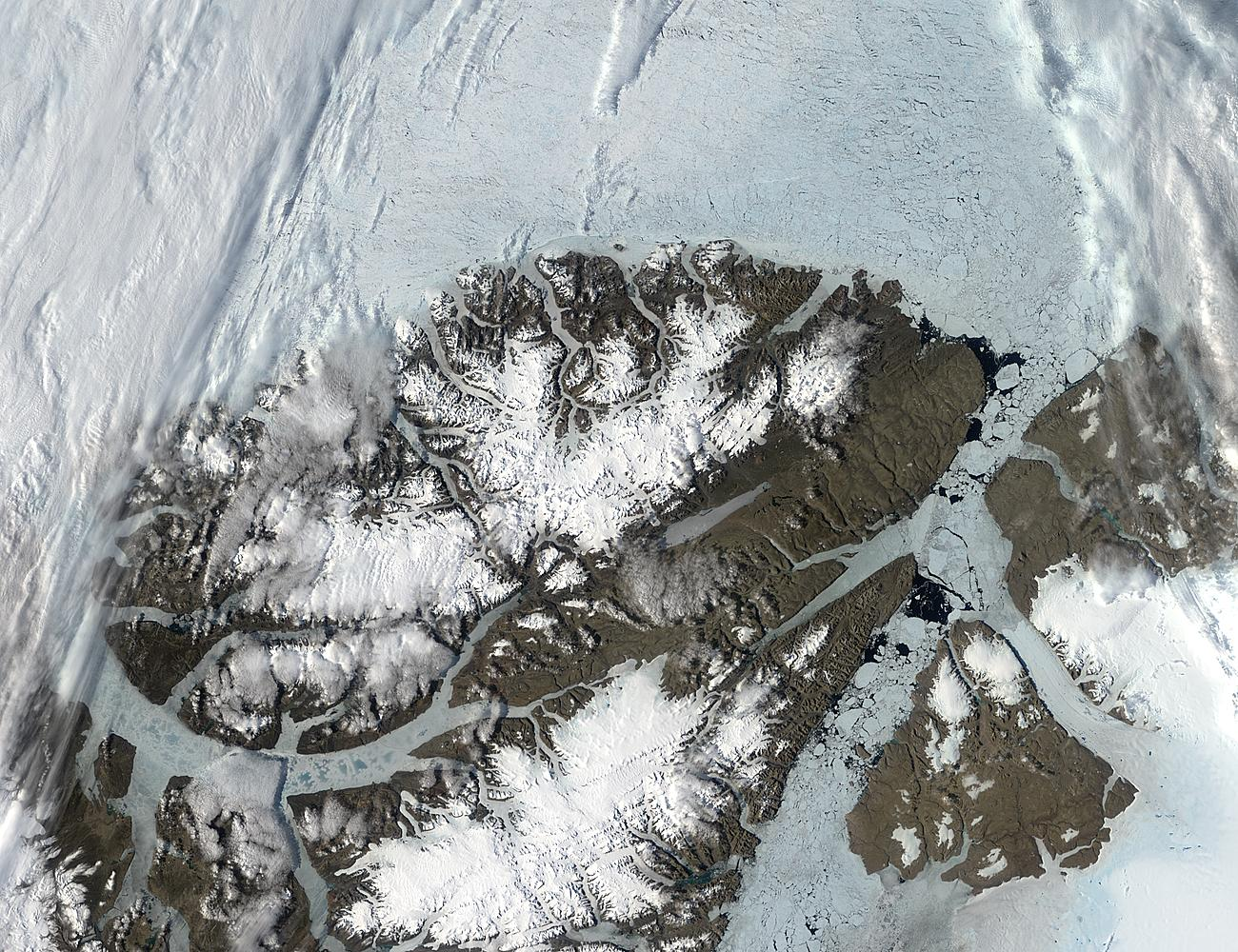
- Satellite image of northern Ellesmere Island and sea ice, showing a portion of the area covered by this protected area

- Location within Nunavut Location within Canada
- Location: Ellesmere Island, Nunavut, Canada
- Nearest city: Alert (Canadian Forces base); Grise Fiord (hamlet)
- Coordinates: 83°10′N 84°50′W
- Area: 319,411 km^{2} (123,325 sq mi)
- Designation: Marine Protected Area
- Established: 21 August 2019
- Governing body: Qikiqtani Inuit Association
- Administrator: Fisheries and Oceans Canada
- Website: Tuvaijuittuq MPA

Tuvaijuittuq Marine Protected Area is a marine protected area located off the northwest coast of Ellesmere Island in Nunavut, Canada. The goal of the marine protected area is to protect the rich biodiversity and dynamism of the High Arctic sea ice ecosystem. Covering an area of 319,411 square kilometres (123,325 mi^{2}), Tuvaijuittuq is the largest protected area in Canada and among the largest protected areas in the world. It is part of a large oceanic region referred to as the Last Ice Area, located adjacent to the coasts of northern Greenland and the Canadian Arctic Archipelago, which contain and accumulate the oldest remaining sea ice in the Arctic.

== History ==
Tuvaijuittuq was established by ministerial order under the Oceans Act for interim protection on 21 August 2019. Under the order, no new or additional human activities will be allowed to occur in the area for up to five years while the Qikiqtani Inuit Association, the Government of Nunavut, and the Government of Canada work to establish long-term protection of the area. Exceptions to this rule include respecting Inuit rights to harvest wildlife under the Nunavut Agreement, scientific research, activities relating to national security and emergencies, and the safe passage of foreign ships through the region.

== Geography ==
The northwest coast of Ellesmere Island is dominated by thick, multi-year pack ice which accumulates due to the combination of ice transport, from the circulation of the Beaufort Gyre and ice motion from the Transpolar Drift, combined with the land masses acting as natural physical barriers.

== Ecology ==
Sea ice provides habitat for ice-adapted organisms within the neritic and pelagic zones of the area, most notably ice algae. In addition, seabed communities in this area exhibits higher than expected levels of biodiversity and biological productivity.

== See also ==
- Tallurutiup Imanga National Marine Conservation Area
