= Gully Marine Protected Area =

Protected area in Nova Scotia

- Interactive map of Gully Marine Protected Area
- Location: North Atlantic Ocean
- Coordinates: 43°50′43″N 58°56′17″W
- Length: 1,000 km (620 mi)
- Area: 2,363 square kilometres (584,000 acres)
- Established: May 2004

Gully Marine Protected Area is a protected marine conservation area in Nova Scotia, Canada. It is 200 kilometres (120 mi) from mainland Nova Scotia, and 45 kilometres (28 mi) east of Sable Island. It was established in May 2004.

== Geography ==
Gully Marine Protected Area protects approximately 2,363 square kilometres (584,000 acres) of area, contributing approximately 0.04% toward Canada’s marine conservation target. The area includes the Gully, which can reach down to 3,000 metres (9,800 ft) in its deepest parts.

== Biodiversity ==
Gully Marine Protected Area provides habitat for the endangered northern bottlenose whale and supports a diverse range of marine species, such as cold-water corals, sharks, tunas, and swordfish. 19 coral taxa have been documented in the canyon area, such as the bubblegum coral. It is also inhabited by at least 16 species of whales and dolphins, including the blue whale.

The population of the northern bottlenose whale has shown signs of recovery following the establishment of the Gully Marine Protected Area.

== Prohibitions ==
The regulations prohibit any activities that disturb, damage, destroy or remove living marine organisms or any part of their habitat, unless the activity is listed on the regulations or is approved by the minister.

== See also ==
- List of protected areas of Nova Scotia
