= The Gully (Atlantic) =

Underwater canyon in the Atlantic Ocean east of Nova Scotia

Coordinates: 43°46′12.1″N 58°52′38.9″W

The Gully is a large underwater canyon in the Atlantic Ocean near the edge of the eastern continental shelf of North America. It is located east of Nova Scotia near Sable Island.

The Gully is over 65 km long and 16 km wide and reaches depths of over 1 km. It is home to a resident population of northern bottlenose whales, purple sunstarfish and deep-sea coral. Other species of whales, dolphins, fish, squid and shrimp also live there.

In 2004, Canada designated The Gully a Marine Protected Area, named Gully Marine Protected Area. Fisheries and Oceans Canada prohibit oil and gas exploration within this MPA.
