= Hendrickson Island =

Island in Canada

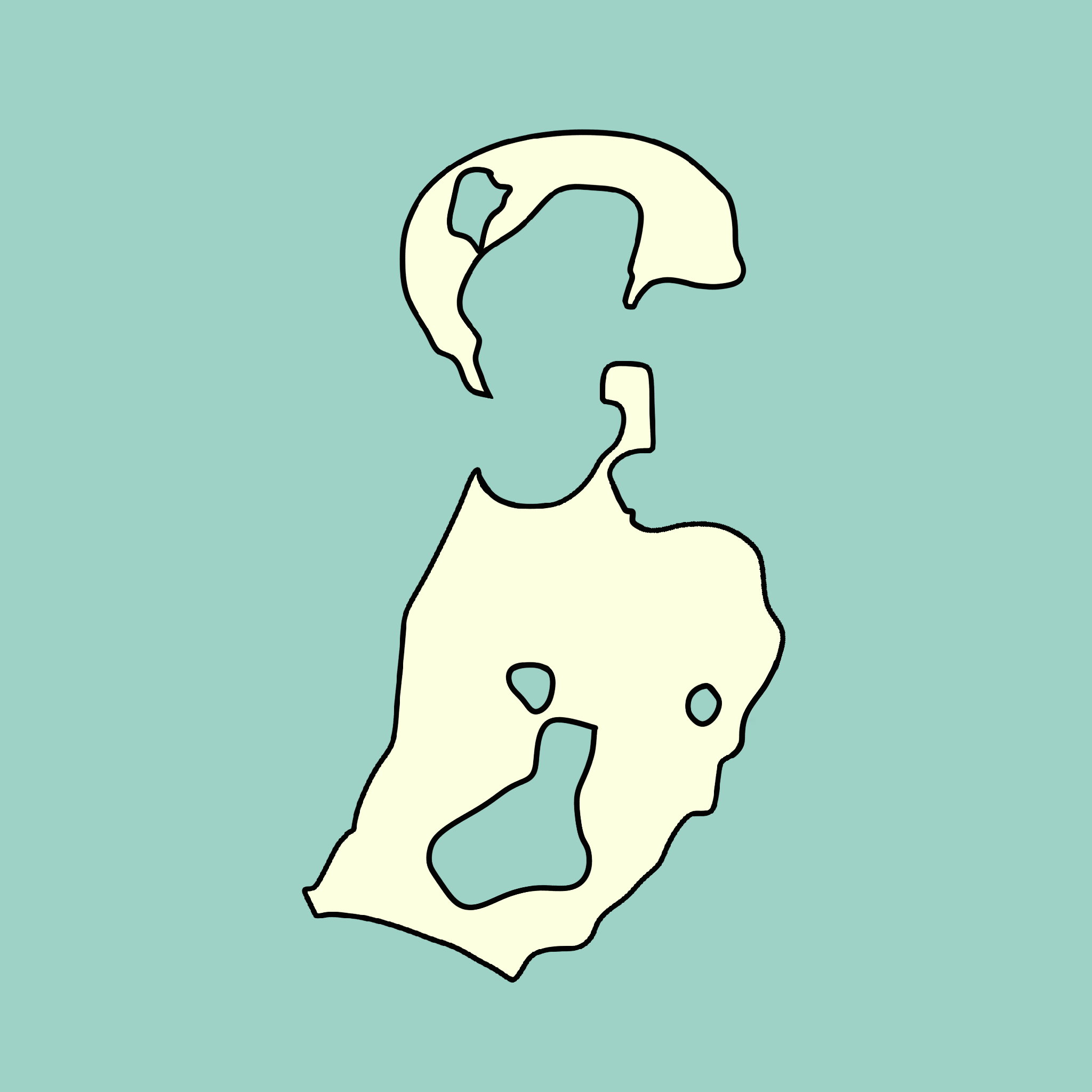
- Hand-drawn map of Hendrickson Island

Geography
- Location: Beaufort Sea
- Coordinates: 69.50172°N 133.59182°W

Administration
- Canada
- Northwest Territories

Hendrickson Island (also known as Qikiqtaq Island) is a small island near the Mackenzie River delta in the Northwest Territories, Canada. It is situated in the Beaufort Sea. The island is located about 20 km (12 mi) northwest of Tuktoyaktuk.

Hendrickson Island is characterized as low and swampy, with three knolls visible from the east. The largest knoll is located at the southern end of the island.

The waters around Hendrickson Island are used by whale hunters. The island has its own monitoring program used for collecting data on whales.

== Name ==
The island was named on 28 February 1945 by the Canadian government.

Its traditional name Qikiqtaq was given by the Inuvialuit people and refers to the large size of the island.

== Hunting and animals ==
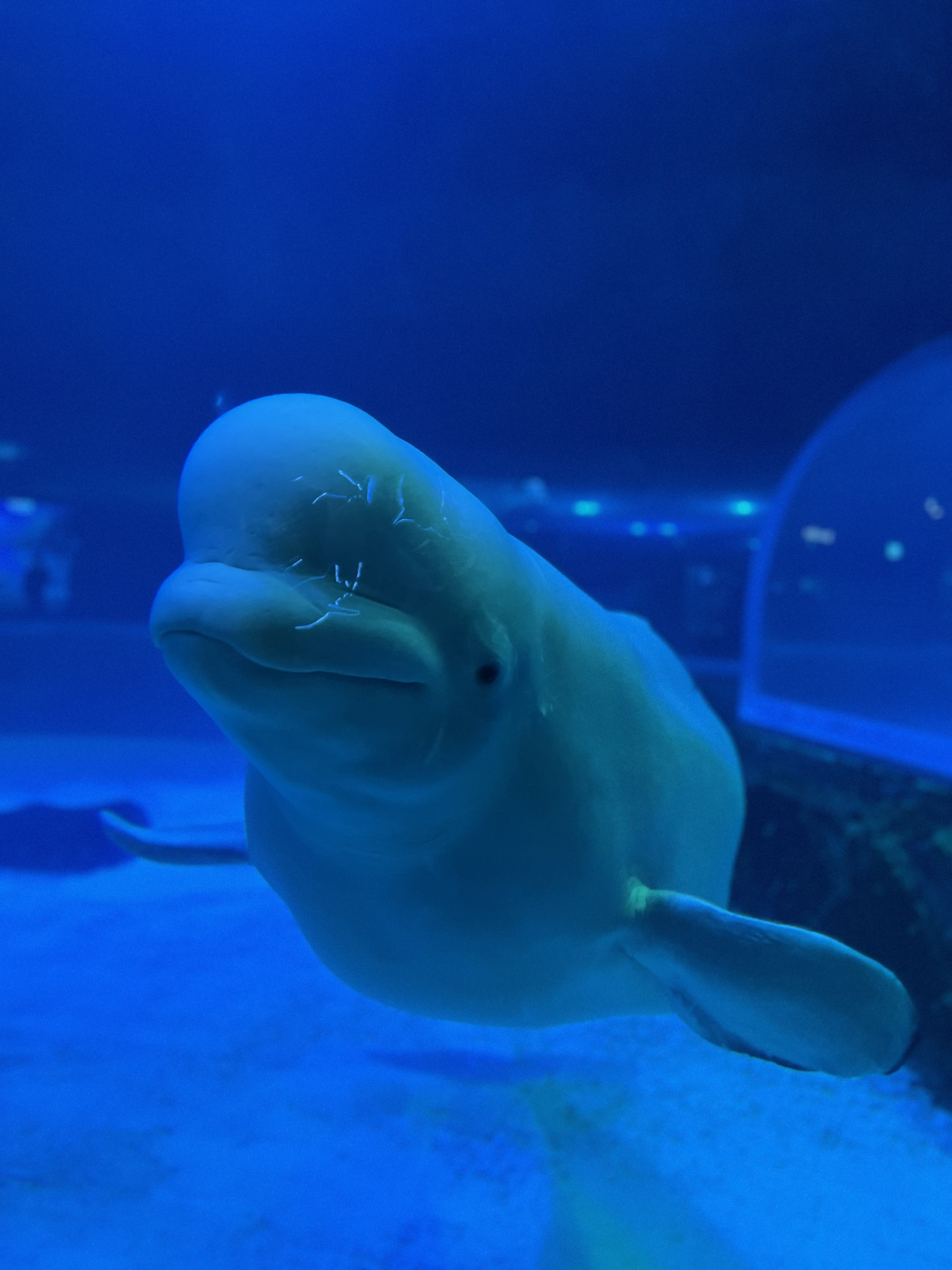
Beluga whale

Hendrickson Island is a hunting destination for local communities. Inuvik and Tuktuuyaqtuuq residents use the surrounding waters of Hendrickson Island for beluga whale hunting. The island is also utilized for general whaling, fishing, and grizzly bear hunting.

Besides beluga whales, killer whales have also been observed by hunters.

Small groups of narwhals can be seen along the coast of Hendrickson Island.

== Monitoring program ==
Hendrickson Island has a monitoring program. Researchers, monitors and scientists from Fisheries and Oceans Canada collect data on whales, as well as take samples. Residents of Tuktoyaktuk have taken hunted whales for testing there.

== Findings ==
Tuktuuyaqtuuq interviewees identified Hendrickson Island as one of the historical sites in the Inuvialuit Settlement Region. Interviewees also mentioned seeing many burial sites and old houses, such as sod house sites along the coast of the island.
