= Laurentian River System =

Underground river in Ontario, Canada

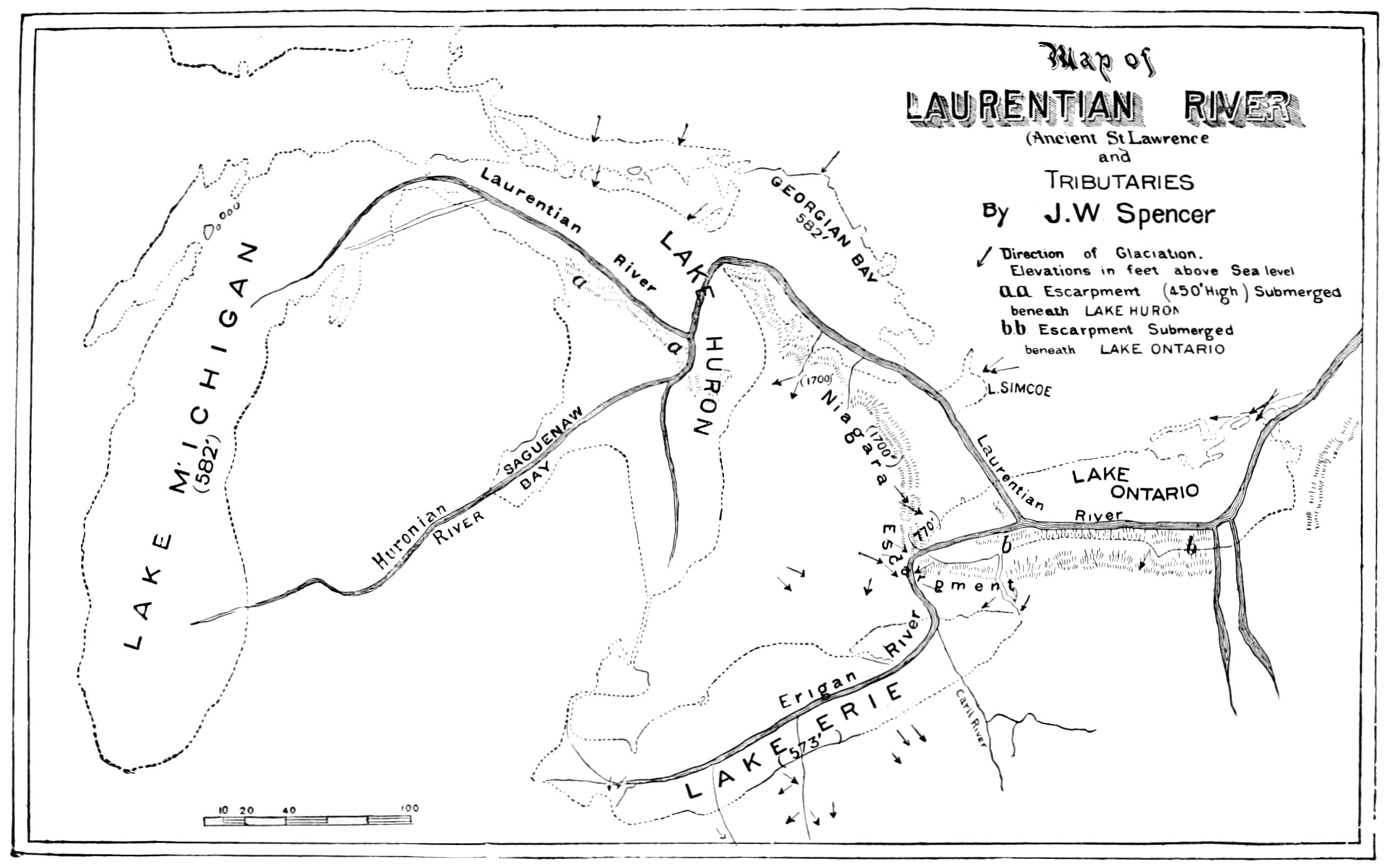
An 1890 map of the ancient Laurentian River

The Southern Laurentian Channel is an ancient underground river in southern Ontario, Canada. The river predates the recent ice ages. The river valley was filled with glacial debris. Water still flows down this old valley—underground. The source of the aquifer is the Georgian Bay, approximately 200 kilometres (120 mi) away.

In 2003 it was discovered that the southern section of the Laurentian aquifer reaches under High Park in Toronto, Ontario, Canada. This is believed to be where the Laurentian River System drains into Lake Ontario. An overflow pipe is visible running into Spring Creek in High Park and is always at a steady flow. Its current purpose is to enrich local coldwater wildlife in the creek and relieve hydrostatic pressure. The area surrounding the outlet is stained red indicating a high iron content. The water flowing from it is naturally pure and cool, at around 6-9 degrees Celsius or 42-48 degrees Fahrenheit.

During the discovery of the Laurentian Channel, a well was drilled to investigate further. While it was being drilled, a massive burst of water, silt and gravel suddenly rocketed out of the well. Somehow, the Laurentian Channel's flow to Lake Ontario had been blocked, causing a huge pressure buildup.

The bedrock under Toronto has several dips believed to be carved by the Laurentian River.

The Laurentian Channel, 25–30 km wide in some areas, 100 km long, and greater than 100 m deep, still lacks data regarding its total size and sediments, relying on well sites for information. Sediments in the channel range from sands and gravels near the bottom and clay-like silts near the top.

== See also ==
- List of rivers of Ontario
- Laurentian Channel
