= Kendall Island Migratory Bird Sanctuary =

Migratory bird sanctuary in the Northwest Territories, Canada

- IUCN category IV (habitat/species management area)
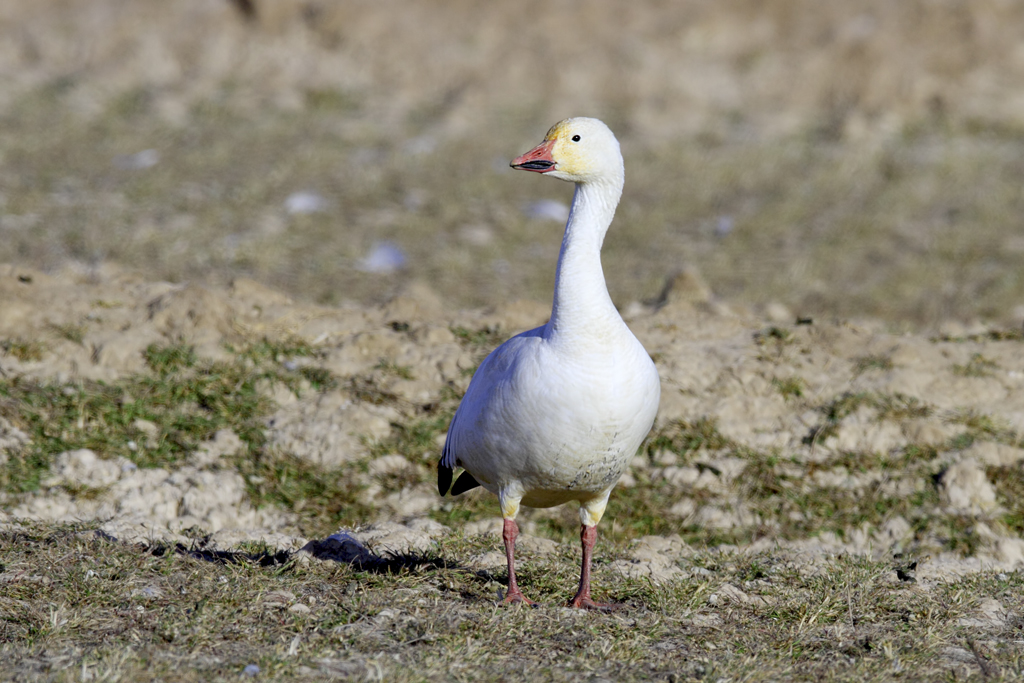
- A priority species in this sanctuary, the lesser snow goose, shown here in white phase
- Interactive map of Kendall Island Migratory Bird Sanctuary
- Location: Northwest Territories, Canada
- Nearest city: Inuvik
- Coordinates: 69.333°N 135.088°W
- Area: 620 km^{2} (240 sq mi)
- Established: 1961
- Governing body: Parks Canada

The Kendall Island Migratory Bird Sanctuary (KIBS) is a migratory bird sanctuary in the Northwest Territories, Canada. It is located on Kendall Island and its surrounding area in Mackenzie Bay at the northern tip of the Mackenzie River Delta. A seasonal sanctuary for more than 60,000 shorebirds, it is one of five bird sanctuaries within the Inuvialuit Settlement Region. The area that is now known as the KIBS is a traditional Inuvialuit whaling site.

The KIBS was established in 1961 to protect the breeding colony of lesser snow geese. The IUCN Category IV site area is 609 km^{2} (235 sq mi) of which 197 km^{2} (76 sq mi) make up the marine portion which have marine and intertidal marine components, but not subtidal. Part of the Mackenzie River Delta, a key migratory bird terrestrial habitat site (NT Site 12), is located within the KIBS.

== Geography ==
The sanctuary is located on the coast of the Beaufort Sea approximately 120 kilometres (75 mi) west of the community of Tuktoyaktuk, and 140 kilometres (87 mi) north of Inuvik. The low-lying landscape consists of shallow channels and extensive mudflats among islands composed mostly of muskeg. Several hills in the KIBS have upland terrain that has remained above water level since glaciation. The ground in these hills is covered by sand or glacial till.

== Natural resources ==
Two confirmed natural gas fields are located within the KIBS. The fields contain 4.8 trillion cubic feet of natural gas, representing more than half of the gas intended to fill the Mackenzie Valley Pipeline.

== Wildlife ==
KIBS is frequented from May through October by more than 90 bird species, including many migrating waterfowl. Compared to other Key Habitat Sites in Northern Canada, particularly high densities of Arctic tern, greater white-fronted goose, loon, northern pintail, and sandhill crane frequent the area. Tundra swan concentrate around the outer section of the MBS. A colony of approximately 3000 lesser snow geese have been identified at KIBS, as well as nationally significant numbers of Hudsonian godwit and whimbrel. The short-eared owl, a Species at Risk Act-listed bird, has been records at KIBS, as well as grizzly bear, polar bear and wolverine, which are listed species by Canada's Committee on the Status of Endangered Wildlife, and the highly endangered Eskimo curlew. The Lapland longspur appears to be avoiding the KIBS because of seismic lines and drilling pads brought on by natural gas exploration.

An animation of tagged tundra swan movements, where individuals can be seen in the Mackenzie Delta area in June through September.
