= Beaufort Gyre =

Wind-driven ocean current in the Arctic Ocean polar region

The Beaufort Gyre and Transpolar Drift are major ocean currents within the Arctic Ocean.

The Beaufort Gyre is one of the two major ice currents in the Arctic Ocean, along with the Transpolar Drift. It is located roughly north of the Alaskan and Canadian coast. In the last few decades, warming temperatures in the Arctic have caused an extensive loss of sea-ice volume in the gyre and the Arctic Ocean as a whole, as well as a decline in average ice age and thickness.

Formerly, masses of sea-ice would circulate for several years, allowing the ice to survive multiple summer melts and leading to the formation of very thick multi-year ice. The oldest and thickest sea ice in the Arctic, with pressure ridges up to 12 meters thick, would mostly accumulate north of the Canadian coast in an area that is today called the Last Ice Area, where sea-ice is expected to persist in summer even when other parts of the Arctic Ocean become ice-free.

== Dynamical mechanisms ==
In the Beaufort Gyre, free-floating sea ice, which is very mobile and susceptible to winds, drifts in a clockwise direction due to a high-pressure system that fosters anti-cyclonic winds. Historically, the sea ice drifted around the gyre for up to ten years, growing thicker and ageing into so-called multiyear ice, while accumulating snow and ice each winter. This process used to supply the Arctic with extensive multiyear sea ice coverage. Warming temperatures and increased melt in the Beaufort Sea in the recent decades have led to widespread loss of this multi-year ice. Today, significant amounts of the sea ice melt before completing the journey around the gyre, and instead of increasing, the ice volume declines. This decline affects the whole Arctic sea ice cover, because the thick multi-year ice that grew in the Beaufort Gyre supplied the whole Arctic ice pack with thick multiyear ice.

At the end of the 20th century, analyses of increasing Pacific Surface Water temperatures led to the discovery of a connection between these rising temperatures and the onset of severe loss of Arctic sea ice in the Beaufort Sea. A reason for the existence of this link was proposed: "...delayed winter ice formation allows for more efficient coupling between the ocean and wind forcing." These dynamical mechanisms are observed in the spin-up and circulation of the Beaufort Gyre.

Variation of Arctic sea ice from 1984 to 2019. Younger ice (first-year ice) is shown in darker shades, while older ice (four-year or older) is shown in white.

In recent years, the declining sea ice volume, and the increasing freshwater content of the gyre has been the focal point of many studies. The decline in Arctic sea ice has been attributed primarily to anthropogenic climate change, with human influence identified as the main driver of observed sea-ice loss since the late 20th century. Researchers have employed coupled sea-ice-ocean general circulation models in order to thoroughly analyse these observations.

Variations in the Ekman transport change the sea surface height and depth of the halocline, resulting in Ekman pumping. During anticyclonic regimes—where the wind stress curl is negative—freshwater is pumped into the Beaufort Gyre; during cyclonic regimes—where wind stress curl is positive—freshwater is released into the Arctic Ocean, where it can then flow into the North Atlantic. Giles et al. (2012) conclude that the variability in freshwater content varies with wind stress curl. The wind stress curl used by Giles et al. (2012) is from the NCEP/NCAR Reanalysis data at the National Oceanic & Atmospheric Administration, Earth System Research Laboratory, Physical Sciences Division (NOAA/OAR/ESRL PSD) in Boulder, Colorado, USA.

The seasonal cycle of freshwater content does not only concern mechanical (Ekman pumping) processes, but thermal (ice formation) processes as well. The Beaufort Gyre contains a mean volume of 800 km^{3} of frozen freshwater, or sea ice, based on a mean ice thickness of 2 meters. During the June–July months, the mean seasonal cycle of freshwater content peaks; in this season, sea ice thickness reaches a minimum, implying that the amount of melted sea ice has reached a maximum. The maximum in freshwater content released into the ocean waters coincides with a maximum in wind stress curl (i.e., a minimum in Ekman pumping), allowing for a high volume of freshwater to seep into the Arctic Ocean circulation. This rapid influx of freshwater into the Arctic circulation forces a large volume of freshwater to outflow into the North Atlantic basin, affecting the Atlantic Meridional Overturning Circulation.

== Studies ==
The Beaufort Gyre has formed a dome of freshwater that has expanded vertically by about 15 centimetres (5.9 in) since 2002; by 2011 it had swelled to about 8,000 cubic kilometres (1,900 cu mi) in volume. The freshwater within this gyre represents about 10% of all the freshwater in the Arctic Ocean; the majority of the Arctic's freshwater supply originates from Russian rivers as runoff. The clockwise circulation of the Beaufort Gyre is induced by the wind patterns associated with the permanent anticyclonic high pressure system over the western part of the Arctic. In a clockwise-rotating gyre in the Northern Hemisphere, the Coriolis force causes the ocean water to flow inward toward the gyre's center where it accumulates, effectively forming a dome of water. If the wind patterns shift into a cyclonic circulation due to the residence of a low pressure system (rising air induced by warmer ocean temperatures a greater volume of open Arctic Ocean water), this will cause the circulation of the Beaufort Gyre to reverse and flow counter-clockwise. If this occurs, the Coriolis force would bend the flow out and away from the center of the gyre and, instead of the formation of a rising water dome, a depression would form and upwelling of the warmer water from the Atlantic ocean would occur.

Oceanographer Andrey Proshutinsky has theorized that if the winds and the gyre's circulation were to weaken, high volumes of freshwater could leak out of the eastern part of the Arctic Ocean into the Northern Atlantic Ocean, impacting the Thermohaline Circulation and thus climate.

Due to seasonal sea ice formation, the Beaufort Gyre is difficult to access and thus study in the Northern Hemisphere winter months; the lack of sunlight in these months forces the use of artificial light. Studies by Arthur S. Dyke and others show that if the volume of outflow of rivers into the Beaufort Gyre increase, the gyre itself might spatially shift toward the right.

== See also ==
- Atlantic meridional overturning circulation
- Eddy (fluid dynamics)
- Flaw lead
- Francis Beaufort and the Beaufort Sea
- Transpolar Drift Stream
