= Laurentian Channel =

Underwater valley in the Gulf of Saint Lawrence

- Location within Canada
- Location: Gulf of Saint Lawrence
- Coordinates: 48°30′00″N 62°00′00″W
- Type: Undersea Feature, Valley
- Part of: Saint Lawrence River, Gulf of Saint Lawrence
- River sources: Saint Lawrence River
- Ocean/sea sources: Atlantic Ocean
- Basin countries: Canada
- Max. length: 750 nautical miles (1,390 km; 860 mi)
- Max. width: 30 nautical miles (56 km; 35 mi)
- Surface area: 35,840 square kilometres (13,840 mi^{2})
- References: Geographical Names of Canada - Laurentian Channel

The Laurentian Channel is a deep submarine valley off the coast of eastern Canada in the Gulf of Saint Lawrence.

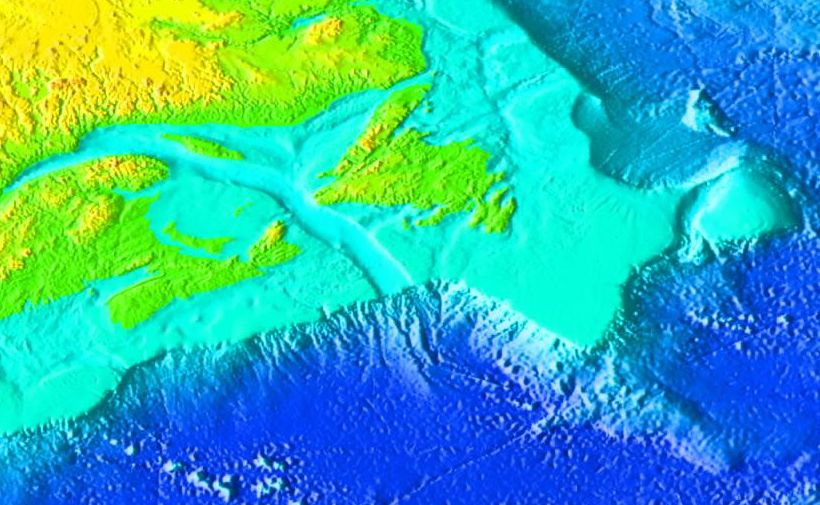
Bathymetry of the Gulf of Saint Lawrence

The channel is of glacial origin and is the submerged valley of the historic Saint Lawrence River, running 1,400 kilometres (870 mi) from a sharp escarpment downstream from the confluence of the St. Lawrence with the Saguenay River, past Anticosti Island and through the Gulf of St. Lawrence to the edge of the continental shelf off the island of Newfoundland.

Its depth ranges from 180–550 metres (590–1,800 ft) with sub-tidal shelves on each side of the channel ranging in depths of less than 100 metres (330 ft). The channel ranges from a minimum width of 10 kilometres (6.2 mi) to as much as 55 kilometres (34 mi) at the Laurentian fan which is located at the edge of the continental shelf.

Deep waters with temperatures between 2 and 6.5 °C (36 and 44 °F) enter the Gulf at the continental slope and are slowly advected up the channel by estuariane circulation. Over the 20th century, the bottom waters of the end of the channel (i.e. in the Saint Lawrence estuary) have become hypoxic.

== Ecological importance ==
The Laurentian Channel is an ecologically important area, providing critical habitat for a variety of marine species, some of which are fished commercially and others that are not. Non-commercial species are part of the marine ecosystem in the area. The Laurentian Channel contains the highest concentration of black dogfish in Canadian waters and is the only place where pupping occurs. It is an important spawning, nursery, and feeding area for a variety of species including porbeagle shark and smooth skate. Porbeagle sharks and basking sharks move into the area in the spring and reside there throughout the summer. One of only two known porbeagle shark mating grounds occurs within the channel. Two species at risk, the northern wolffish and the leatherback sea turtle, have been found in the area. In addition, at least 20 species of whales and dolphins have been observed in the area, as it is a critical feeding area and migration route into and out of the Gulf of St. Lawrence.

The Laurentian Channel contains significant coral and sea pen populations, representing sensitive benthic habitats. Coral and sea pens are important to the ecosystem and depend on the integrity of the sands and muds in the area for their survival. Of the variety of coral species found in the area, sea pens have been recorded in the greatest numbers and diversity, with the Laurentian Channel being described as having the highest sea pen concentrations within the entire Newfoundland and Labrador Shelves Bioregion.

== Laurentian Channel Marine Protected Area ==
A portion of the Laurentian Channel was identified as an Ecologically and Biologically Significant Area (EBSA) in 2007. On June 8, 2010, the Minister of Fisheries and Oceans Canada announced the Laurentian Channel as an Area of Interest (AOI). The AOI encompasses a portion of Laurentian Channel located off the southwest coast of Newfoundland and Labrador, an area of 11,619 square kilometres (4,486 mi^{2}). In June 2017, Fisheries and Oceans Canada (DFO) proposed the Laurentian Channel AOI as a Marine Protected Area (MPA) under the Oceans Act. In April 2019, Fisheries and Oceans Canada designated the Laurentian Channel Marine Protected Area (MPA).

The main purpose of the Laurentian Channel Marine Protected Area is to protect the biodiversity of the region. This MPA explicitly protects porbeagle sharks, smooth sakes, basking sharks, black dogfishes, northern wolffish, and leatherback sea turtles, along with sea pens and other cold water coral. Atlantic cod is not officially protected, the Laurentian Channel MPA could encompass a possible spawning ground. Much is still to be discovered regarding the life cycle of Atlantic cod which makes it a difficult species to protect using smaller, specific MPAs (SLOSS Debate). Thus, due to the large, undivided size of the Laurentian Channel MPA, the chance of protecting the region where Atlantic cod spawn is significantly higher.

== See also ==
- Laurentian River System
- Cabot Strait
- 1929 Grand Banks earthquake
- Laurentian Slope Seismic Zone
