= Hudson Complex =

Arctic marine ecoregion encompassing Hudson Bay and its adjacent water bodies

- French: Complexe Hudson
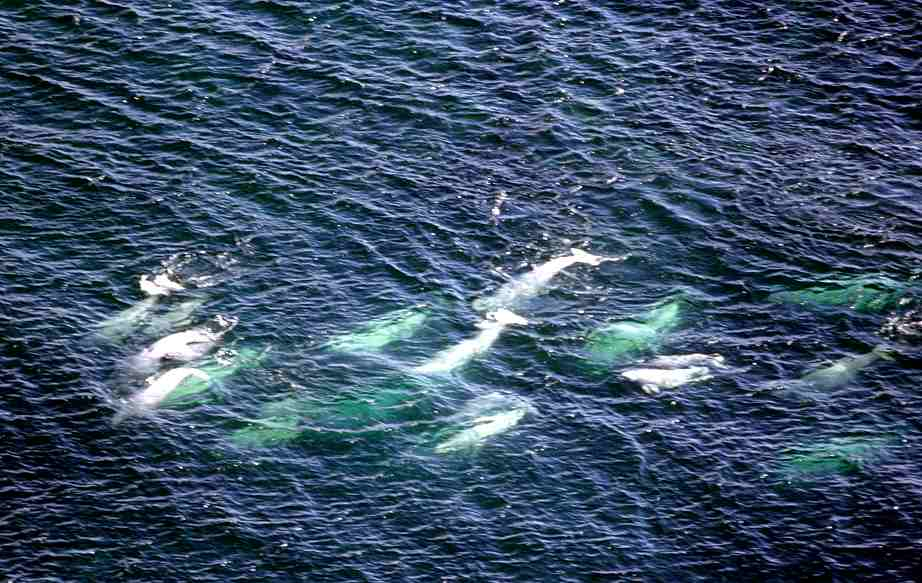
- School of beluga whales in Hudson Bay

- Location: Canada
- Coordinates: 60°N 85°W
- Part of: Arctic

The Hudson Complex is a marine ecoregion in Canada, part of the Arctic marine realm.

The Hudson Complex includes Hudson Bay and smaller James Bay to the south, as well as the Foxe Basin, Hudson Strait and Ungava Bay. The Canadian mainland surrounds the Hudson Complex on the west and south and Baffin Island on the north. Straits connect the Hudson Complex to other marine ecoregions to the northwest and east. A line connecting Cape Chidley, Resolution Island and Baffin Island serves as the western boundary of the ecoregion, where it transitions to the Northern Labrador marine ecoregion to the east. The Fury and Hecla Strait, between Baffin Island and the Melville Peninsula, is the transition to the Lancaster Sound marine ecoregion to the northwest.

== See also ==
- List of marine ecoregions in Canada (WWF)
