= Pacific Marine Ecozone =

Canadian marine ecozone

Pacific Marine
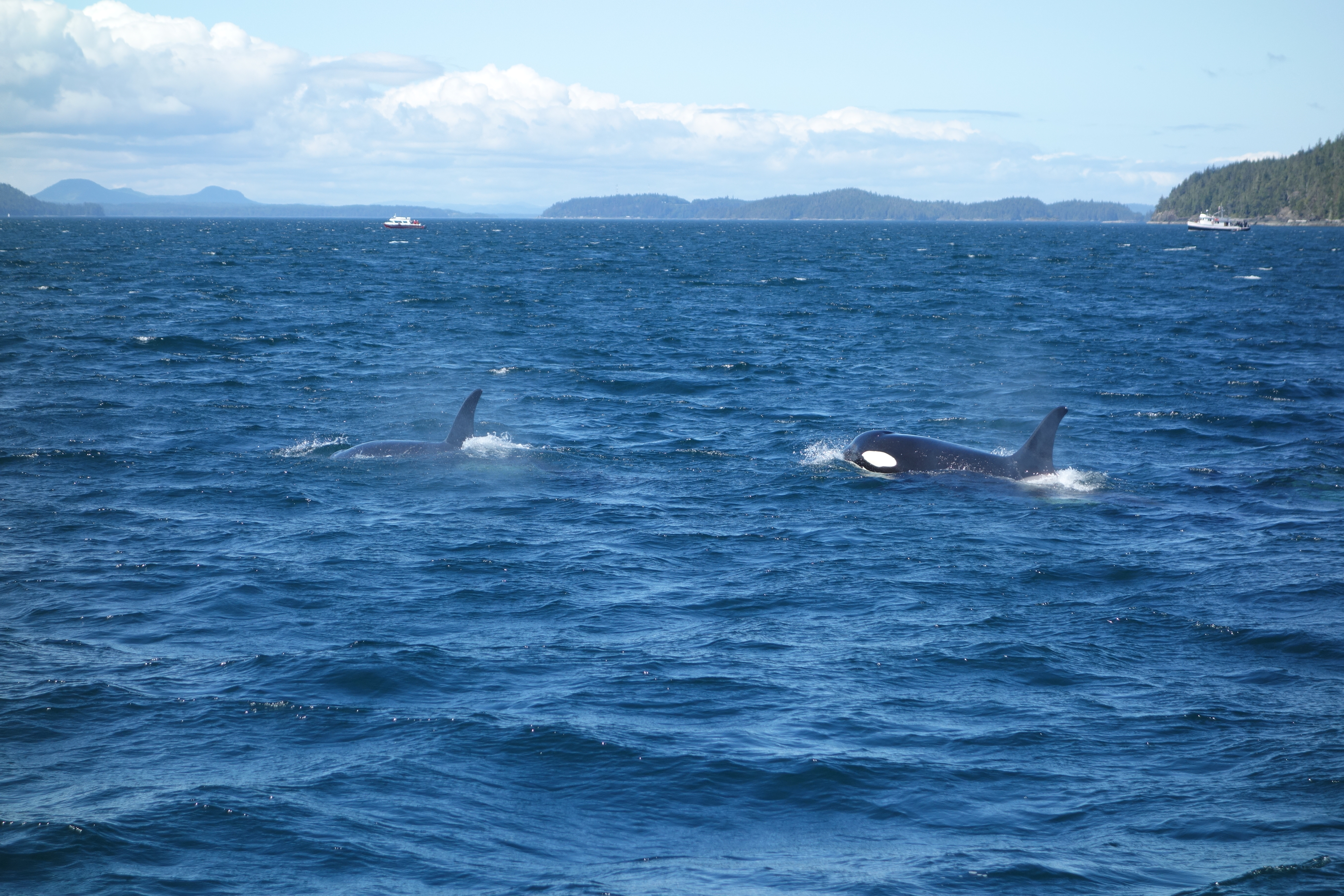
- A pair of orcas breaching in Johnstone Strait, British Columbia

Geography
- Countries: Canada; United States
- State/Province: Alaska; British Columbia; Oregon; Washington
- Oceans or seas: Pacific Ocean, Salish Sea

The Pacific Marine Ecozone, as defined by the Commission for Environmental Cooperation (CEC), is a Canadian and American marine ecozone extending to the international waters of the Pacific Ocean from the coasts of Alaska, British Columbia, Washington and Oregon. The islands within the Canadian portion are part of the adjacent Pacific Maritime ecozone.

Famous for its tourism and an important shipping channel for Canada, the zone is subject to intense human activity which has damaged ecosystems. Primary effects include overfishing, pollution and even direct habitat destruction. The large and increasing population in nearby coastal areas, including the major centres of Vancouver and Seattle, exerts significant strain on the natural habitats within this ecozone.

== Geography ==
The large rivers flowing from the Rocky Mountains are a source of nutrients for this ecologically diverse region. They enter the shallow waters over the continental shelf, which underlies the entire ecozone and represents the edge of the North American tectonic plate. This plate is constantly folding under the Pacific Plate, causing volcanic activity at their juncture and earthquakes along the coast.

== Climate ==
The land barrier imposed by the Alaskan cape prevents much of the cold arctic currents from flowing south along the west coast, so there is little oceanic water exchanged between the Arctic and Pacific ecozones. The moderating effect of the Pacific Ocean results in a nearly constant year-round temperature in this ecozone. The Alaska Peninsula also inhibits the flow of cold Arctic currents from entering this zone, ensuring that throughout its extent, there is little variation in temperature. In fact, there is little exchange of oceanic waters between the Pacific Ocean and the Arctic Ocean. Ice forms here infrequently, and only in its northern areas in the Bering Sea and the Sea of Okhotsk.
