= Last Ice Area =

Region of the Arctic

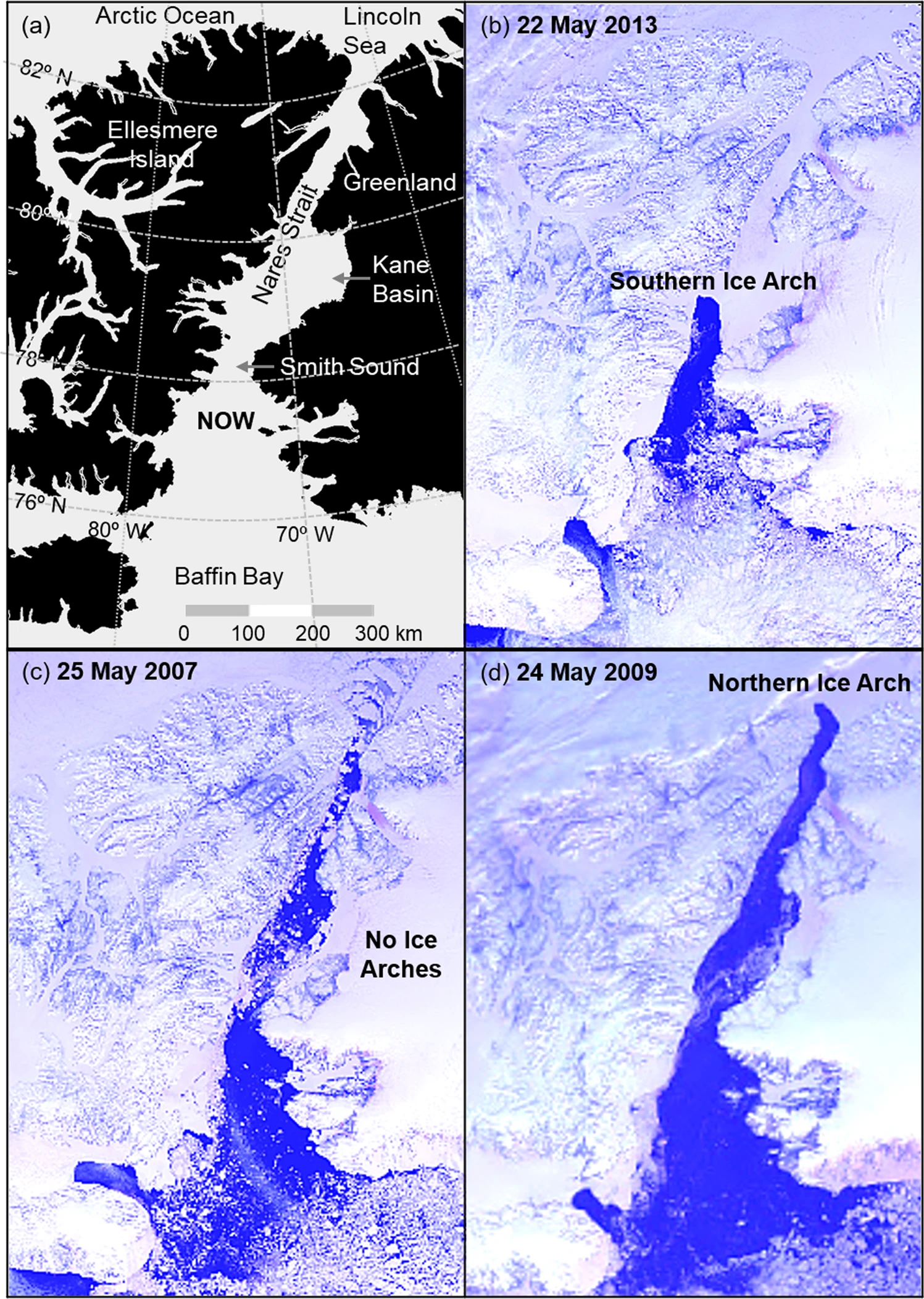
Portion of the Last Ice Area - the North Water polynya (NOW) situated between Ellesmere Island and Greenland. Anomalous ice formation were recorded on the Smith Sound ice in 2007 (c) and 2009 (d).

The Last Ice Area is broadly the large interior polar region of the Arctic Circle covering an area between the northern edge of Greenland and the Canadian Arctic Archipelago and is the most northerly coastal zone of the world. In this area, the oldest and thickest sea ice in the Arctic is expected to persist longest. Towards the northern side, it consists of the Tuvaijuittuq Marine Protected Area, which is the largest protected area in Canada and among the largest protected areas in the world. It is one of the major centres of environmental concerns that is bound to have global impact. The Arctic Council's 2017 report Snow, Water, Ice and Permafrost. Summary for Policy-makers predicted that current rate of climate change will cause the complete disappearance of the ice within a century.

== Geography and conservation ==
The Last Ice Area covers the central area of the Arctic Circle, thereby representing the most northerly coastal zone of the world. It is so named because of its old and thick ice sheet which is expected to last the longest as a sea ice in the Arctic. The northern side falling under the Government of Canada is declared the Tuvaijuittuq Marine Protected Area, the largest protected area in Canada. Due to its environmental concerns and ecological impact it can have, a number of areas are proposed for protection, including Tallurutiup Imanga National Conservation Area, Pikialasorsuaq, and Nunavut protected areas.

== Ecology ==
The Last Ice Area is a natural habitat to endemic animals including bowhead whales, polar bear, Peary caribou, and muskoxen. Walrus, narwhal, and beluga whales are also living here.

== Environmental concerns ==
Arctic sea ice has been monitored by satellites since 1979, and has been recorded to be melting away every decade. The ice sheets are becoming thinner and younger, indicating increasing fragility. The major threats are emissions from greenhouse gases and fossil fuels that are primary causes of global warming. Indicators of severe climate changes such as shifting of algal blooms and ecosystem disturbances have been recorded. The A computational study in 2021 showed that the Last Ice area may retain its year-round sea ice if the global warming does not exceed a threshold (2°C of the preindustrial average global temperature). However, the United Nations had warned in its Emissions Gap Report 2021 that under the current trend of emission from fossil fuels and greenhouse gases, global warming will increase by 2.7°C by 2100. This has set an alarming environmental issue that life on the ice will eventually perish, from planktons to polar bears.
