= Kendall Island =

Uninhabited island in the Northwest Territories, Canada

Coordinates: 69°29′24″N 135°17′17″W

Kendall Island is one of the irregularly shaped, uninhabited Canadian arctic islands in the Northwest Territories, Canada. It is located in Mackenzie Bay at the northern tip of the Mackenzie River Delta. Richards Island is to the southwest of Kendall Island. Kugmallit Bay is bounded by Garry, Pelly Island and Kendall Islands. The northeast portion of the island is high.

It is situated within the Inuvialuit Settlement Region and is notable for the Kendall Island Migratory Bird Sanctuary, an important waterfowl and shorebird breeding and staging ground. It was named by John Franklin after the English hydrographer Edward Nicholas Kendall. The Canadian ornithologist J. Dewey Soper visited the island less than a year before his retirement.
