= Arctic Archipelago Marine Ecozone =

Canadian marine ecozone

Arctic Archipelago Marine
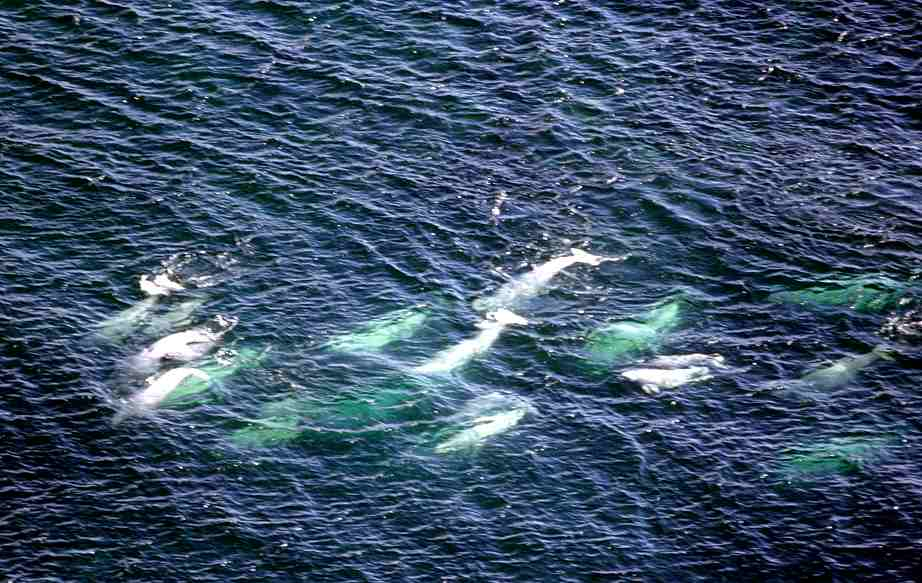
- School of beluga whales in Hudson Bay

Ecology
- Borders: Arctic Basin Marine; Northwest Atlantic Marine

Geography
- Country: Canada
- Province: Manitoba; Northwest Territories; Nunavut; Ontario; Quebec; Yukon
- Oceans or seas: Arctic Ocean

The Arctic Archipelago Marine Ecozone, as defined by the Commission for Environmental Cooperation (CEC), is a marine ecozone in the Canadian Arctic, encompassing Hudson Bay, James Bay, the internal waters and some shores of the islands in the Canadian Arctic Archipelago, and the shores of the territories, northern Ontario and western Quebec. Early exploration of these waters by Europeans were conducted to find a passage to the Orient, now referred to as the Northwest Passage.

It is inextricably tied to the terrestrial ecozones of the Arctic Cordillera, Northern Arctic, Southern Arctic, Hudson Plains, Taiga Shield, Taiga Plains, and Taiga Cordillera, as well as the marine ecozones of the Arctic Basin Marine and Northwest Atlantic Marine.

== Climate ==
It is characterised by frigid, windy winters with average temperatures below -30 degrees Celsius, and summer temperatures typically near 10 degrees. The thick ice which cover the ecozone in the winter connect the islands and continental land with a continuous sheet that prevents navigation, but allows the migration of various animals. The ice partially melts during the summer, though ice floes are numerous in some parts. Polynyas may occur throughout the ecozone, but are most common near the Nares Strait in northern Baffin Bay.

== Geography ==
Primarily in the arctic with the exception of a portion of its southern extent in Hudson Bay and James Bay, the Arctic Archipelago is a vast marine ecozone with average water depths of 150 to 500 metres. It contains all of James Bay, Hudson Bay, the Foxe Basin, Queen Maud Gulf, Baffin Island Shelf, Lancaster Sound, the waters within the Arctic Archipelago, and most of the Beaufort Sea.

=== Hudson Bay and James Bay ===
James Bay and parts of Hudson Bay are the only constituents of this ecozone south of the arctic region, and exhibit greater biodiversity. The most southerly reach, to the shores of northeastern Ontario and northwestern Quebec, includes areas used for staging, nesting and breeding by numerous species of birds. This area covers Southern James Bay, which includes migratory bird sanctuaries at Hannah Bay and the mouth of the Moose River, and Akimiski Island.

This portion of the ecozone abuts the Hudson Plains, which contains the world's "largest continuous wetlands" due to poor drainage of the ecozone. The resultant wetlands and bogs form the interface between the Hudson Plains and Arctic Archipelago ecozones, as typified by Southern James Bay.

=== Territorial shoreline ===
Covering the entire Canadian northern continental shoreline, this marine ecozone is adjacent to a number of territorial ecozones. The Taiga Shield connects the Hudson Plains from the Manitoba shoreline to the Southern Arctic ecozone in Nunavut, which also extends along most of the continental shoreline of the Northwest Territories. The Taiga Plains ecozone forms the remaining Northwest Territories shoreline connection to the Arctic Archipelago ecozone, covering much of the western portion of the Northwest Territories and small portions of northern Alberta and British Columbia. The Yukon shoreline connects the Arctic Archipelago marine ecozone with the Taiga Cordillera, a mountainous region covering most of northern and eastern Yukon, and parts of the western Northwest Territories.

The northeastern Nunavut continental landmass is within the Northern Arctic ecozone, as is most of the land of all the islands in the Arctic Archipelago.

== Ecology ==
Biological activity in this ecozone is greatest during late summer, during which sufficient portions of ice have melted to allow photosynthesis by phytoplankton, the most significant food source in the ecozone. The southern intertidal zones also support kelp forests. These provide food for shorebirds and waterfowl, whose populations can increase dramatically during the fall and spring migrations. Moreover, the polynyas that form during the winter provide access to food for various species, including polar bears. Summer thaw results in plentiful ice margins along which birds and other animals can fish.

Arctic cod, found throughout the ecozone, is an important food source for seals, beluga whales and narwhals. Polar bears and ringed seals are found throughout the ecozone, whereas the range of bearded and harp seals consists of the eastern coast of Ellesmere Island. The largest Canadian population of polar bears is found near Churchill, Manitoba, on the coast of Hudson Bay.

The salt marshes and tidal flats of Hudson Bay contain transient and permanent populations of waterfowl that are among the most densely concentrated in the world, and the northwest coast is home to one of the largest populations of peregrine falcons.
