= Arctic Basin Marine Ecozone =

Canadian marine ecozone

Arctic Basin Marine
- Broken pieces of Arctic sea ice with a snow cover

Ecology
- Borders: Arctic Archipelago Marine

Geography
- Country: Canada
- Territory: Northwest Territories; Nunavut; Yukon
- Oceans or seas: Arctic Ocean

The Arctic Basin Marine Ecozone, as defined by the Commission for Environmental Cooperation (CEC), is a Canadian marine ecozone encompassing the northwestern areas of waters on the Arctic continental shelf. It is bitterly cold and permanently covered in ice. Polar nights and the midnight sun may last months in this region, which has come to characterize the stereotype of the north. Its only land contact is with the northern coast of Ellesmere Island. Because of this, there are no inhabitants in this zone. All human activity here involves scientific excursions, petroleum exploration, rare hunting groups and extreme adventurers.

== Geography ==
Ice floes that are kilometres long and several metres thick are common in this Arctic Ocean ecozone. Undersea, the dominant feature is the deep Canada Basin, extending from the Beaufort Sea to the North Pole to depths reaching 3,600 m. The Lomonosov Ridge represents its northern submarine extent.

== Climate ==
The region is arid, receiving between 100 and 200 mm of annual precipitation, mostly snow. Mean January temperatures are −30 to −35 °C, though wind chill makes it appear significantly colder.
