= Oceans Act (Canada) =

Legislation regarding the waters around Canada

Parliament of Canada
- Long title: An Act respecting the oceans of Canada
- Citation: S.C. 1996, c. 31
- Enacted by: Parliament of Canada
- Royal assent: 18 December 1996
- Effective: 31 January 1997
- Status: In force

The Oceans Act (French: Loi sur les océans) is a law enacted by the Parliament of Canada, and addresses Canada's self-definition of its territorial waters, exclusive economic zones, and other maritime boundaries. It additionally governs the creation of marine protected zones, the powers of the Canadian Minister of Fisheries and Oceans, and houses the legislative enactment the Canadian Coast Guard.

== Legislative history ==
Canada has only made formal claims to territorial waters in legislation since 1970, under the Territorial Sea and Fishing Zones Act, which the Oceans Act superseded. The 1970 Act established the Canadian adherence to measuring waters by establishing a shore baseline, and measuring outward, with specific determinations delegated to the Fisheries minister, and was superseded in 1996.

In April 1996, the Act was introduced as Bill C-26 in the House of Commons by the Minister of Fisheries and Oceans, Fred Mifflin, and was identical to another bill, C-98, introduced before a parliamentary prorogation earlier in the 35th Parliament. It passed 130–50 on third reading on October 26, 1996, and received Royal Assent in Mid-December 1996.

The Act was unedited between 2005 and 2014, but received multiple updates during the first term of Justin Trudeau's Ministry.

== Statutory details and powers ==
The Act details responsibilities and powers for the designated minister.

The minister is responsible for creation of a national oceans strategy, a document which outlines how the government will protect oceans while integrating management of the ocean and its sources for economic purposes. It furthermore empowers the minister to make "integrated management plans", plans that deal with more specific elements of the national strategy.

The minister is empowered under Section 35 of the act to create marine protected zones if a marine area meets one of six categories that merit protection, such as for conservation of fisheries, protection of unique habitats, or the protection of other marine resources. This is distinct from the process to create marine conservation areas, which is governed under its own specific act and more closely deals with properties that are owned directly by the government as crown waters.

Under Section 39 of the act, the minister is empowered to hire inspectors to enforce any element of the act or regulations made under the act. Inspectors are empowered demand documents, take samples, open containers, or copy data from any place or ship that may have an effect on the marine ecosystem. Inspectors may seize illegal goods found during inspections, and seized goods, unless found to be unlawfully taken by the courts, are disposed of or forfeited to the crown. Inspectors are empowered to enter private property and travel through private property, but may not enter dwellings without a warrant. Inspectors are allowed to redirect ships, and may impound ships for up to 30 days without a charge being laid. They are also allowed to issue compliance orders.

The act under Section 39 also establishes a government right of action to hold companies, directors, or ships' crews liable for damages to Canada's territorial waters. It also provides for certain criminal penalties and rules for legal proceedings under the act.

Part III of the Act deals with the powers of the minister. Section 41 establishes the objectives of the Coast Guard Services, including assisting in navigation, icebreaking, enforcement, and search and rescue. Sections 42 and 43 establishes the minister's authority to order marine surveys and scientific studies; Section 44 establishes the minister's authority to require foreign ships in Canadian waters to provide any research data collected in Canadian waters to the government.

The act finally also provides the authority of the government to create financial penalties for non-compliance with the act. The Act interfaces with the UN Convention on the Law of the Sea, and while the Act largely aligns with the convention's instructions for measuring territorial waters, the Act does not defer to United Nations definitions of internal waters.

== Notable Applications and Jurisprudence ==
The Oceans Act is the key mechanism by which the Government of Canada has committed to protecting 30% of Canadian waters by 2030.

Canadian Geographic has found that some older than 2022 Marine Protected Areas under the act do not have strong protections against certain kinds of economic activity, including oil and gas development. This led to the opening of the St. Lawrence protected area to oil and gas exploration, though development has not yet occurred.

The Act, although enacted in 1997, was noted by The Globe and Mail for not leading to a single Marine Protected Zone by 2002.
