= Fisheries and Oceans Canada =

Government department

- Pêches et Océans Canada

Department overview
- Formed: 1868
- Type: Department responsible for: Sea Coast and Inland Fisheries; Fisheries Science; Habitat Management; Fisheries Enforcement; Small Craft Harbours; Marine Mammals; Hydrography; Oceanography; Coast Guard; Marine Search and Rescue; Aids to Navigation; Icebreaking; Marine Radio
- Jurisdiction: Canada
- Employees: 14,716 (2024)
- Annual budget: $4.1 billion (2023–24)
- Minister responsible: Joanne Thompson, Minister of Fisheries
- Deputy Minister responsible: Paul MacKinnon
- Website: www.dfo-mpo.gc.ca

Fisheries and Oceans Canada (DFO; French: Pêches et Océans Canada, MPO) (Note: Fisheries and Oceans Canada is the applied title under the Federal Identity Program; the legal title is the Department of Fisheries and Oceans.) is a department of the Government of Canada that is responsible for developing and implementing policies and programs in support of Canada's economic, ecological and scientific interests in oceans and inland waters. Its mandate includes responsibility for the conservation and sustainable use of Canada's fisheries resources while continuing to provide safe, effective and environmentally sound marine services that are responsive to the needs of Canadians in a global economy.

The federal government is constitutionally mandated for the conservation and protection of fisheries resources in all Canadian fisheries waters. However, the department is largely focused on the conservation and allotment of harvests of salt water fisheries on the Atlantic, Pacific and Arctic coasts of Canada. The department works toward the conservation and protection of inland freshwater fisheries, such as on the Great Lakes and Lake Winnipeg, through cooperative agreements with various provinces. Provincial governments have enacted provincial fisheries legislation for the licensing of their fisheries. With the exception of Saskatchewan, conservation rules for freshwater fisheries are enacted under the Fisheries Act; six provinces administer these regulations in their own fisheries.

To address the need for conservation, the department has an extensive science branch, with research institutes across the country. Typically the science branch provides evidence of the need for conservation of various species, which are then regulated by the department. DFO also maintains a large enforcement branch with peace officers (known as fishery officers) used to combat poaching and foreign overfishing within Canada's Exclusive Economic Zone.

DFO is responsible for several organizations, including the Freshwater Fish Marketing Corporation and the Canadian Hydrographic Service.

== History ==
Fisheries management heraldic badge worn by DFO Officers

The Department of Marine and Fisheries was created on July 1, 1867, although it did not receive legislative authority until May 22, 1868. The department's political representative in Parliament was the minister of marine and fisheries, with the first minister having been Peter Mitchell. The department was headquartered in the Centre Block of Parliament Hill until the fire of 1916, after which it was moved into the West Block and then off Parliament Hill entirely when new government office buildings were constructed in Ottawa.

== Operations ==
DFO is organized into seven administrative regions which collectively cover all provinces and territories of Canada.

| Region name | Area of responsibility |
|---|---|
| Pacific | British Columbia, Yukon |
| Ontario and prairie | Alberta, Saskatchewan, Manitoba, Ontario |
| Arctic | Northwest Territories, Nunavut |
| Quebec | Quebec |
| Gulf | Prince Edward Island, Gulf of Saint Lawrence watershed (New Brunswick, Nova Scotia) |
| Maritimes | Bay of Fundy watershed (New Brunswick, Nova Scotia), Atlantic Ocean watershed (Nova Scotia) |
| Newfoundland and Labrador | Newfoundland and Labrador |

=== Responsibilities ===
The department's responsibilities were described as follows:

Sea-Coast and Inland Fisheries, Trinity Houses, Trinity Boards, Pilots, Decayed Pilots Funds, Beacons, Buoys, Lights and Lighthouses and their maintenance, Harbours, Ports, Piers, Wharves, Steamers and Vessels belonging to the Government of Canada, except gunboats or other vessels of war, harbour commissioners, harbour masters, classification of vessels, examination and granting of certificates of masters and mates, and others in the merchant service, shipping masters and shipping offices, inspection of steamboats and board of steamboat inspection, enquiries into causes of shipwrecks, establishment, regulation and maintenance of marine and seamen hospitals, and care of distressed seamen, and generally such matters as refer to the marine and navigation of Canada.

Responsibility for the construction and operation of canals was given to the department of public works at the time of confederation, with the canals of the United Province of Canada having been previously operated by that colony's department of public works.

==== Marine Service of Canada ====
In its early days, one of the department's most active agencies was the operation of the Marine Service of Canada, which became the forerunner to the Canadian Coast Guard, with vessels dedicated to performing maintenance of buoys and lighthouses. Whereas fisheries management was not as important as it became in the latter part of the 20th century, a major responsibility for the Department of Marine and Fisheries included the provisioning of rescue stations and facilities at the shipwreck sites of Sable Island and St. Paul Island off Nova Scotia.

The department also had responsibility for overseeing the qualification of apprenticing sailors who desired to become mates or shipping masters, as well as several marine police forces, which attempted to combat illegal crimping, the trafficking of sailors in human bondage at major ports.

The foray into enforcement saw the department operate the "Dominion cruisers" which were armed enforcement vessels operating for the Fisheries Protection Service of Canada, a continuation of the Provincial Marine enforcement agencies of the British North American colonies. These ships and other chartered schooners and the like, would cruise the fishing grounds off the Atlantic and Pacific coasts, watching for violations within Canada's territorial sea, then only three nautical miles (6 km) from shore.

=== Naval service ===
Prior to the First World War, Canada had limited naval forces, with the majority of protection having been provided by the enforcement vessels of the Department of Marine and Fisheries (Dominion Cruisers) or Fisheries Protection Service of Canada, and by Britain's Royal Navy.

In 1909–1910, the Department of Marine and Fisheries became linked to efforts to develop a Canadian naval force, when on March 29, 1909, a member of parliament, George Foster, introduced a resolution in the House of Commons calling for the establishment of a "Canadian Naval Service". The resolution was not successful; however, on January 12, 1910, the government of Prime Minister Sir Wilfrid Laurier took Foster's resolution and introduced it as the Naval Service Bill. After a third reading, the bill received royal assent on May 4, 1910, and became the Naval Service Act, administered by the minister of marine and fisheries at the time.

The official title of the navy was the "Naval Service of Canada" (also "Canadian Naval Forces"), and the first Director of the Naval Service of Canada was Rear-Admiral Charles Kingsmill (Royal Navy, retired), who was previously in charge of the marine service of the Department of Marine and Fisheries. The Naval Service of Canada changed its name to "Royal Canadian Navy" on January 30, 1911, but it was not until August 29, 1911, that the use of "Royal Canadian Navy" was permitted by King George V.

== Enforcement ==
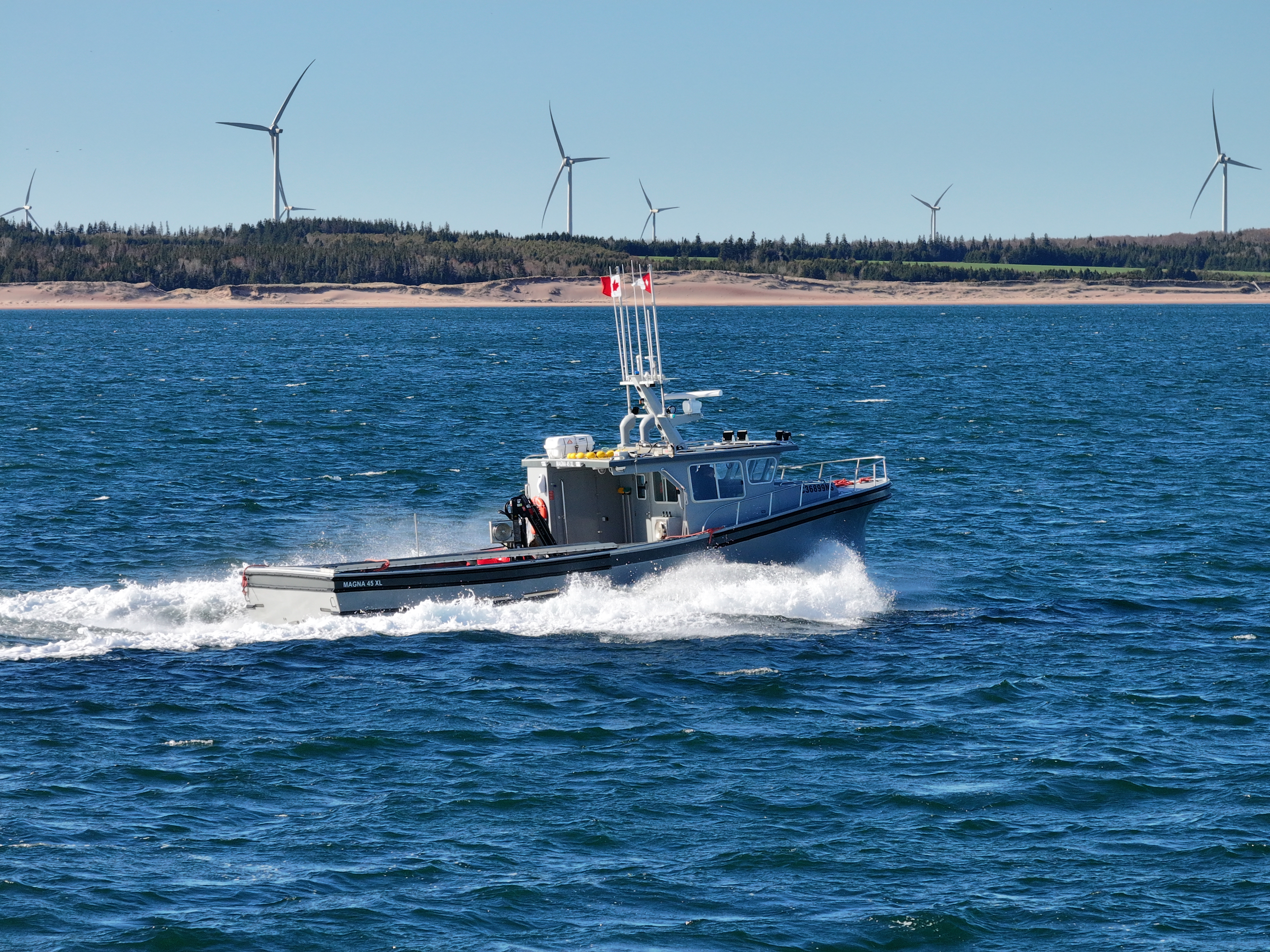
A patrol vessel operated by Fisheries and Oceans Canada off the coast of East Point, Prince Edward Island.

The Conservation & Protection (C&P) directorate is responsible for fisheries enforcement. The program aims to ensure the conservation and sustainable use of Canada's aquatic resources and the protection of species at risk, fish habitat, and oceans. C&P collaborates with a variety of domestic partners, including the Canadian Coast Guard, other federal departments, other levels of government, industry, First Nations communities, recreational fishing groups, and others. Internationally, C&P participates in or indirectly contributes to more than a dozen regional fisheries management organizations (e.g., Northwest Atlantic Fisheries Organization and the North Pacific Anadromous Fish Commission).

C&P promotes compliance with legislation, regulations and management measures through education and shared stewardship initiatives; conducts monitoring, control, and surveillance activities using surface vessels, aerial surveillance aircraft and land patrols; and manages major cases and special investigations. The program includes operational enforcement units in DFO's six regions, the National Fisheries Intelligence Service, the National Digital Forensics Service and Program and Operational Readiness.

Enforcement activities are conducted by three types of officials that are designated under the Fisheries Act: fishery officers, fishery guardians, and fishery inspectors.

Fishery officers are designated under section 5(1) of the act and defined as peace officers under the Criminal Code with the authority to enforce all provisions of the act and other related acts (e.g., the Coastal Fisheries Protection Act) and their regulations. There are currently more than 600 fishery officers serving in more than 100 detachments and offices across Canada. DFO's chief fishery officer is the Director General, Conservation & Protection; as of April 2019, the incumbent is Darren Goetze.

Fishery guardians are also designated under section 5(1) of the act and as peace officers but are not necessarily employed by the department. For example, a provincial conservation officer may be designated as a fishery guardian for the purpose of enforcing the act. In general, fishery guardians cannot conduct a search unless authorized by a warrant or conditions are met under the warrantless search provisions of the Criminal Code. Under the Aboriginal Guardian Program, certain First Nations may submit to the minister to designate certain band members as guardians. In October 2017, DFO and the National Indigenous Fisheries Institute (NIFI) launched a full and collaborative review of the department's indigenous programs, including the Aboriginal Guardian Program.

Fishery inspectors are designated under section 38(1) of the act, specifically to enforce the pollution prevention sections of the Fisheries Act. They are not peace officers and have limited powers vis-à-vis the other two designations.

The directorate uses the Smith & Wesson Model 5946 as the standard sidearm.

== Departmental name changes ==
Since confederation, the responsibilities of the original Department of Marine and Fisheries, namely the Fisheries Service and the Marine Service, have transferred to several other departments. The legal name of the department is the Department of Fisheries and Oceans. It is also referred to as "Fisheries and Oceans Canada" under the Federal Identity Program.

- 1867 – 1884 Department of Marine and Fisheries
- 1884 – 1892 Department of Fisheries
- 1892 – 1914 Department of Marine and Fisheries
- 1914 – 1920 Department of Naval Services
- 1920 – 1930 Department of Marine and Fisheries
- 1930 – 1969 Department of Fisheries
- 1930 – 1935 Department of Marine*
- 1969 – 1971 Department of Fisheries and Forestry
- 1971 – 1976 Department of the Environment
- 1976 – 1979 Department of Fisheries and the Environment
- 1979 – present Department of Fisheries and Oceans

*In 1935, the Department of Marine was merged with the Department of Railways and Canals and the Civil Aviation Branch of the Department of National Defence to form the Department of Transport, also known as Transport Canada.

== Related legislation ==
Text of each law and its regulations can be found by entering the name of the law at the Canadian Legal Information Institute website.

- Canada Shipping Act
- Canada Shipping Act, 2001
- Coastal Fisheries Protection Act
- Department of Fisheries and Oceans Act
- Financial Administration Act
- Fish Inspection Act
- Fisheries Act, which enables the department to establish the 34 Marine Refuges, which are functionally identical to fisheries area closures.
- Fisheries Development Act
- Fisheries Prices Support Act (repealed)
- Fishing and Recreational Harbours Act
- Freshwater Fish Marketing Act
- Navigable Waters Protection Act
- Oceans Act, which creates the 14 Marine Protected Areas
- Species at Risk Act

== See also ==
- Collapse of the Atlantic northwest cod fishery
- British Columbia Shore Station Oceanographic Program
- Marine Mammal Regulations
