= Victoria High School (British Columbia) =

École Secondaire Victoria High School

Location
- 1260 Grant Street; Victoria, British Columbia, V8T 1C2; Canada; 48.4290°N 123.3470°W

Information
- School type: Public, high school
- Motto: Palma non sine pulvere (No reward without effort)
- Founded: 1876
- School board: School District 61 Greater Victoria
- School number: 6161018
- Principal: Ms. Leah Gordon
- Staff: 60
- Grades: 9–12
- Enrollment: 845 (2019–2020)
- Campus: Urban
Colour
- Team name: Totems, Tigers, Titans, Tsunamis, Tsasquatches, Tyees, Tikis, Tigers, Thunderbirds
- Website: vichigh.sd61.bc.ca

École Secondaire Victoria High School, commonly referred to as Vic High, is a high school located in Victoria, British Columbia, Canada. It is the oldest public high school west of Winnipeg, Manitoba and north of San Francisco, California.

== History ==
The high school opened on August 7, 1876, in a log cabin with two classrooms on the school reserve between Yates Street and Fort Street bounded by Fernwood Road, the grounds of the current Central Middle School building. This same cabin had been the first common (or public) school in British Columbia when it was used as a primary school starting in 1853. In 1882, the high school moved to a new wing of a brick building that had been built in 1875–1876 and had been used exclusively as the primary school until occupied by the high school. By 1882 the high school included 80 students and was situated between the primary girls' school in the east wing and the primary boys' school in the west wing. The high school remained pressed between the boys' and girls' central schools until 1903. Victoria's growing population in the 1890s led to Victoria High School being described as "one of the most inadequate school buildings in the Province" by the principal Edward Paul. In 1902, a third Victoria High School was opened, which was also quickly outstripped by Victoria's burgeoning population. This facility was designed by Francis Mawson Rattenbury, architect of the British Columbia Parliament Buildings and The Empress Hotel (or Fairmont Empress Hotel).

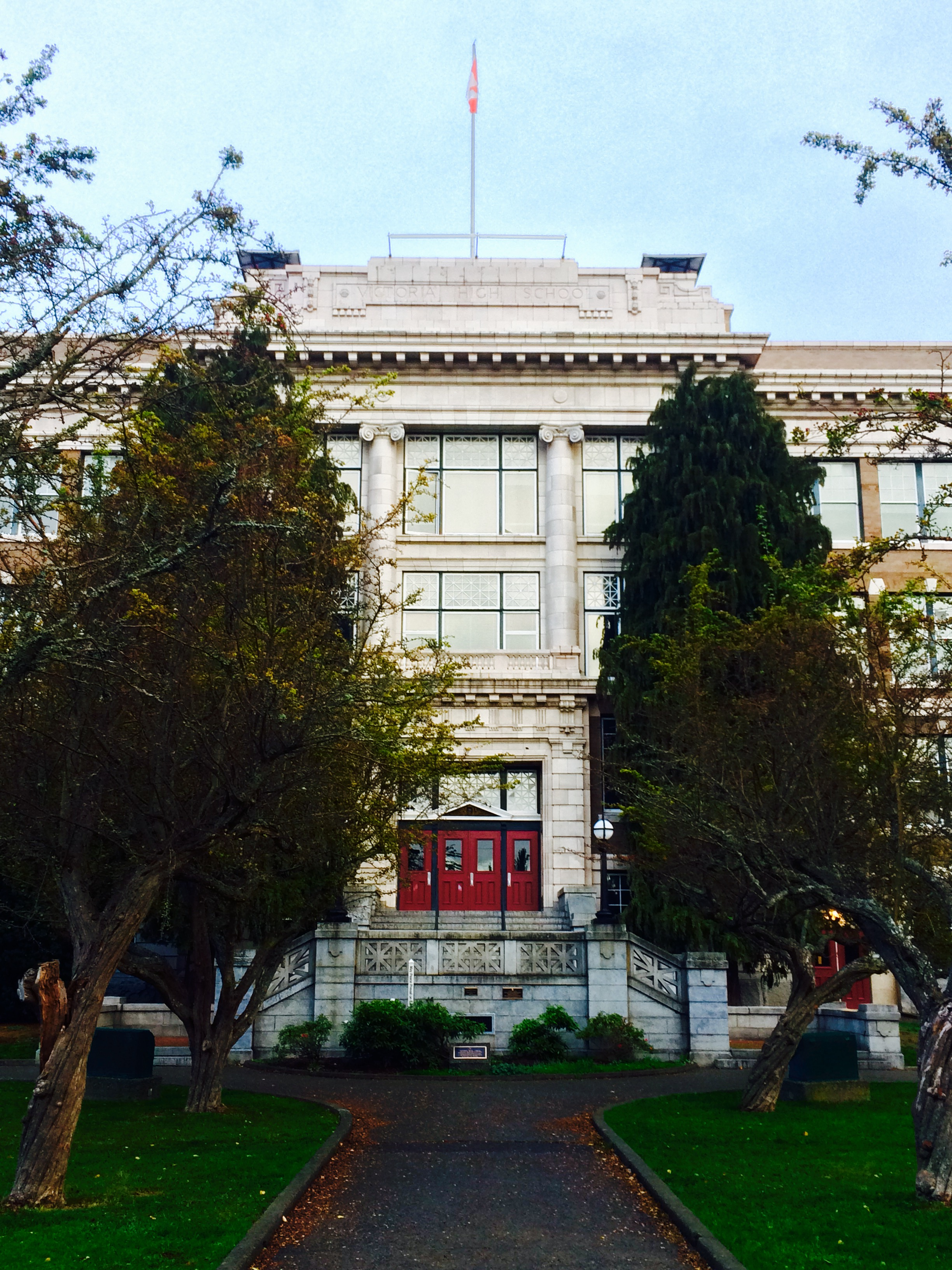
Vic High (main entry, from south)

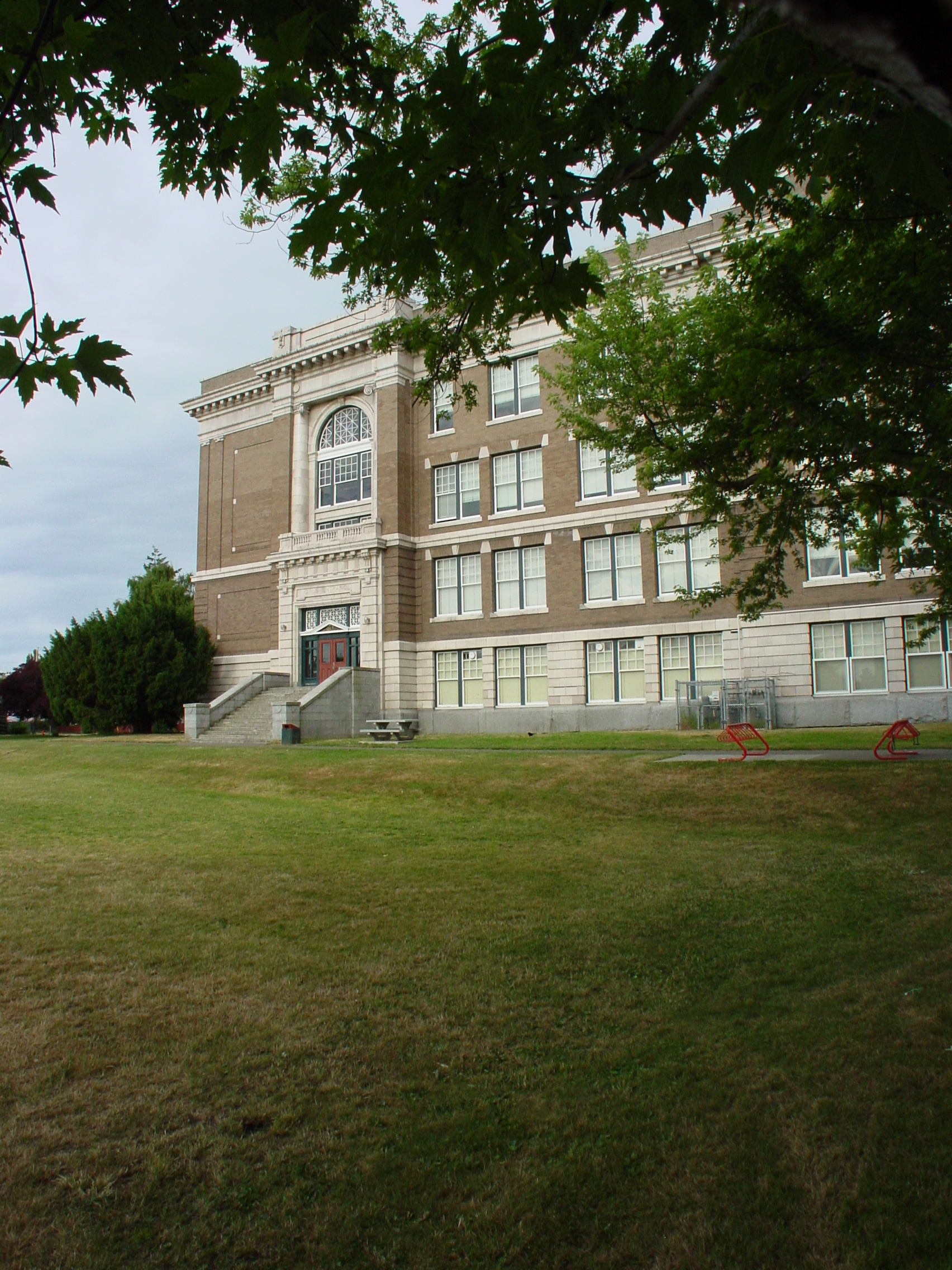
Vic High (Fernwood Avenue side, from the northeast)

The current Victoria High School, the fourth to bear its name, was opened on May 1, 1914, on 3.5 acres (1.4 ha) of land, donated by the City of Victoria, on Grant Street between Fernwood and Camosun Streets. Designed by C. Elwood Watkins, School Architect for the Victoria Board of Education, the school cost slightly more than $460,000. The high school's first principal at the 1914 building was S. J. Willis.

The Rattenbury-designed school was demolished in 1953 and in 1954 a new Central Junior High School building was constructed. The school was later known as Central Junior Secondary (grades 7 and 8) and as of 2002 currently as a middle school offering French immersion (grades 6–8).

Peter L. Smith, himself a graduate of Victoria High School and son of Henry Lawson Smith, longtime principal of Vic High (1934–1955), wrote a history of the school to mark its centennial celebrations in 1976: Come Give a Cheer: One Hundred Years of Victoria High School.

When the province renamed all its high schools "secondary school", Victoria High School, Oak Bay High School, and Esquimalt High School were the only schools to retain "high school" as part of their names.

=== Victoria College ===
In 1903, Victoria College (the precursor to the University of Victoria) started as an annex to the high school on the Fort Street site. During 1914–15 Victoria College was located on the top floor of the new Grant Street building. When the University of British Columbia opened in 1915, Victoria College suspended operation until 1920 when it reopened at nearby Craigdarroch Castle.

== Facilities ==
=== Architecture ===
The current school building, which was designed in 1911 and opened in 1914, has been listed on the City of Victoria's Heritage Registry since 1982.

The foundations of the school are made of impressively heavy 4-foot-square blocks of granite. The building has two ornate facades, including some very large windows which offer prime views of downtown Victoria and the Fernwood neighbourhood. The building is U-shaped, with a large auditorium inside the U. Additions to the school have turned the spaces between the auditorium and the rest of the building into inaccessible courtyards.

The school has two gymnasiums, one of which is from 1914 and is notable for having a wooden running track suspended 20 feet above its floor. There is a rifle range in the attic, and there is an old tradition that the graduating students sign their names there. There are three large underground floors for storage and boiler rooms.

There are two war memorials in the school's main entrance, one for the First World War and another for the Second World War. After the Second World War a large flag (four stories high) was commissioned. It had blue and red maple leaves on it, each representing a student or staff member who died in the war, respectively. It was then lost until 2005, when it was found in the school's basement. For Remembrance Day it was hung from the school's fourth floor.

=== Fairey Tech ===
Technical education shops were first opened at Vic High in 1943 as part of the training effort for the Second World War. The facilities were built to the west of the playfield by trainee soldiers with assistance from Vic High students. Trades such as carpentry, bricklaying, and metalwork were taught. In September 1949, classes began in new Industrial Arts facilities, which had been added onto the south end of the wartime building to provide shops for electrical, automotive, sheet metal, welding and woodwork plus classrooms and drafting rooms. The enlarged facility was named the F.T. Fairey Technical Unit after Col. F.T. Fairey, the former Deputy Minister of Education, the then-current provincial Director of Industrial and Technical Education and also the Regional Director of the Canadian Vocational Training Program. Fairey Tech immediately became a focal point for technical education in Victoria and beyond, both for daytime and evening adult education classes. Additions were made to the facility In the 1950s, including a much larger auto-shop complex and an electronics shop and classroom. Later renamed the Fairey Technical Centre, in addition to previous disciplines it also housed classes for industrial design, art metal and jewelry, and even dance. The facility was closed in 2011 and replaced with the Fairey Technical Building, a new 57,000 square foot addition to the north side of the main school building.

=== 2020 Renovation ===
The Government of B.C. provided $77.1 million for seismic upgrades and a 200-seat expansion of Victoria High to keep students safe and ensure they are not attending an overcrowded school. Construction on the upgrades and expansion at Vic High began in August 2020. Students were re-located to a renovated SJ Willis while the project was underway. Students returned to the 1914 campus on April 8, 2024 after extensive refits, additions and delays in construction.

[18]

== French immersion ==
Vic High offers a French immersion program, functioning as a pathway school for both late immersion and some early immersion students from Central Middle School. It often hosts regional French public speaking competitions known as Concours.

== Fine arts ==
Vic High offers a fine arts program, including theatre, music, and dance. There was a neighbourhood choir. The Music Department includes a Rhythm and Blues Band

== Athletics ==
The following athletic programs were offered as of the 2017–2018 school year:

- Badminton
- Basketball
- Cross-country running
- Rowing
- Rugby (Girls and Boys 7's)
- Soccer
- Swimming
- Track and field
- Volleyball
- Weight room training
- Intramural programs: basketball, indoor soccer and ring hockey

Athletic accomplishments: 2016–17 AAA Sr Boys Basketball South Island Champions, 2017–18 AAA Sr Girls Volleyball South Island Champions

The current athletic director is Matt Phillips.

== Weather station ==
Vic High hosts an active weather station as part of the School-Based Weather Station Network, operated as a partnership between the University of Victoria and several school districts to provide state of the art interactive technologies as part of the school's science program.

== Former principals ==
- S. J. Willis
- Ira Dilworth 1926–1934
- Henry L. Smith 1934–1955
- H.D. Dee
- G.A.V. (Victor) Thomson
- J.D. (Duncan) Lorimer 1965–1979
- Jack (John) Lowther
- Bill (William) Garner
- David Watkins 1985–1989
- Keith McCallion 1989–1994
- Dennis Harrigan 1994–2002
- Keith Forshaw 2002–2006
- Stephen Bennett 2006–2010
- Randi Falls 2010–17
- Aaron Parker 2017–2025
- Leah Gordon 2025-

== Notable alumni ==
- David Anderson, Canadian cabinet minister and MP
- Sid Barron, editorial cartoonist
- Danielle Bennett, artist
- Emily Carr, artist
- Joseph Clearihue, lawyer
- Victoria Chung, medical missionary
- David Day, author and poet
- Sam Dunn, documentary filmmaker
- Mohammed Elewonibi, football player
- Hans de Goede, international rugby player
- Barry M. Gough, historian and author
- Michiel Horn, professor emeritus of history and university historian at Glendon College, York University, in Toronto
- Byron Ingemar Johnson, premier of British Columbia
- Lily Laverock, journalist, impresario and suffragist
- Alan Lowe, mayor of Victoria
- Samuel Maclure, architect
- Carol Sabiston, textile artist
- Jack Shadbolt, contemporary artist
- Spoony Singh, founder of the Hollywood Wax Museum
- Simon Fraser Tolmie, premier of British Columbia
- Mark Wyatt, rugby player
- Torchy & Doug Peden, internationally acclaimed cyclists
- Dr. Norma Mickelson, OBC, OC, educator
- Dr. Wallace Chung, medical researcher and innovator
- Jim Taylor, sports writer
- Dr. A. J. Stewart Smith, particle physicist
- Dr. Maria Tippett, Canadian cultural historian
- Richard Hunt, First Nations artist
- Jessica Monroe-Gonin, Olympic rowing medalist
- Chris Tollmath, Executive Producer behind Breaking Bad
- Stephen Dorsey, author, Black and White, An Intimate Multicultural Perspective on "White Advantage" and the Paths to Change (Nimbus Publishing 2022)
