= Victoria Chung =

Canadian physician

- Born: Chung Toy Mea; August 19, 1897; Victoria, British Columbia
- Died: May 17, 1966 (aged 68); Kongmoon, China
- Other names: Zhang Xiaobai, Cheung Chiu Pak, Victoria Cheung
- Occupations: Physician, medical missionary
- Children: 1

Victoria Chung was a Canadian medical missionary and physician. She was the first Chinese-Canadian to become a certified physician, as well as one of the first female interns at Toronto General Hospital. She became a surgeon and hospital administrator of the Marion Barclay Hospital for Women and Children, today the Jiangmen Central Hospital in Kongmoon, as part of the United Church's South China Mission. Her practise at the hospital spanned several decades, during the Chinese Civil War, the Japanese occupation of the Second Sino-Japanese War, and during the early days of the People's Republic of China.

== Early life ==
Victoria Chung was born as Chung Toy Mea in 1897 in Victoria, British Columbia to Sing Noon Chung, a former Canadian Pacific Railway construction worker and Yin Han, a midwife. She was named after Queen Victoria, who in 1897 was celebrating her Diamond Jubilee, and for the city where her parents had settled. As a young girl she expressed interest in becoming a medical missionary in China. In November, 1900, Victoria was placed in the Chinese Rescue Home, later renamed the Oriental Home, by her parents. The Oriental Home was operated by the Women's Missionary Society of the Methodist and Presbyterian Church, and it operated a daycare, school, residence and temporary wedding chapel.

== Education ==
While still boarding, Victoria was enrolled in kindergarten at the Oriental Home. At the time, the Victoria School Board had banned Chinese students from attending their schools between 1903 and 1909. Once the ban was lifted, Victoria returned to the family home and began attending public school in 1909, enrolling at Central Middle School. In 1913 she enrolled at Victoria High School and graduated first class in 1916. She then took first year arts at Victoria College. Chung was particularly skilled in the sciences and math, although in high school she struggled with Latin, with a grade of 59%. She was rewarded a medical scholarship by the Presbyterian Women's Missionary Society (WMS) in 1917 and began studying at the University of Toronto that fall.

Chung's arrival at U of T was noted at the time by the Toronto Star and the university's paper, The Varsity:

“Among the girl freshies who registered at the university was an interesting little personage from Victoria, B.C., Miss Victoria Chung. Miss Chung is a very bright and attractive little Chinese maid who has come to this city with the intention of entering on the medical course, in the hope that she may go back among her own people as a medical missionary.”

Out of a class of 79 graduates, Chung was one of 14 women, who included Lillian Chase. Chung graduated from medical school in 1922 and wrote her final exams for certification in 1923 with Ontario's College of Physicians and Surgeons. She began an internship at Toronto General Hospital in the summer of 1922, becoming one of the first female residents at the hospital. On June 17, 1923, Dr. Chung and three others, including Dr. Robert McClure, were consecrated by minister George C. Pidgeon for overseas missionary service. Fourteen days later, the Chinese Exclusion Act received royal assent, precipitating Dr. Chung's choice to leave for China.

After being assigned her practise in Kongmoon, Dr. Chung continued to further her education by taking furloughs to attain more training every five or six years. This included graduate training at Bellevue Hospital in 1929 and more studying in Toronto. During her second furlough she was a resident at the London School of Hygiene & Tropical Medicines. Dr. Chung would also give lectures and presentations at learning and faith institutions in Canada, including the Women's Missionary Society. In 1948 she attended the Annual Conference on Medical Missions in Washington, D.C.

== Practice in China ==
Dr. Chung departed Victoria in late 1923 for Kongmoon, via Hong Kong. At the time, the port of Kongmoon was a British run "free port". The British established a Customs House, run by the Chinese Maritime Customs Service, one of several in China at the time.

=== Early practise ===
As part of the United Church's South China Mission, the WMS assigned Dr. Chung to the Marion Barclay Hospital for Women and Children in Kongmoon. The hospital was mainly funded by the WMS and the United Church, but it also received funding from other missionary groups in Canada. When she was first assigned to the hospital, Kongmoon and the surrounding area were considered rural. The hospital had about thirty beds, no electricity or running water and outdated equipment. Her early practise at the hospital took place during expansion of the hospital compound, with a new building created as a men's wing, while the existing building would become the women's wing, under the direction of Dr. Chung and Dr. MacBean, with Dr. Chung taking on sole direction in 1925. Between 1925 and 1927, in the wake of anti-imperialist protests and suppression, Dr. Chung and other missionaries evacuated the hospital twice and relocated to Hong Kong. In the late 1920s the hospital was supplied with electricity and running water, and connected to telephone. The Women's Hospital had increased to have 40 beds by this time. While on her first furlough in the United States in 1929–1930, she purchased an Elliot Machine for the hospital, a medical device used to reduce pelvic inflammation.

During the 1930s, Dr. Chung became the principal medical officer of the hospital and was responsible for supervising its overall operations. She undertook any responsibilities that were needed, including work in administration, the hospital dispensary, teaching nursing at the hospital, and being the acting chief medical officer of the Men's section of the hospital. In addition to these responsibilities, Dr. Chung was the corresponding secretary for the WMS, who she relied on for funds. The hospital had private contracts with the British Customs House, to provide additional funds for its expanding operations. By the mid-1930s, the hospital was expanded again, adding a new wing, and the hospital obtained typewriters, an X-ray machine and refrigeration equipment. Dr. Ching also obtained an ambulance for the hospital. The hospital also reduced its fees and waived fees for obstetrical in-patient care in 1934. By 1936, donations in Canada had fallen so such a degree that a group of Canadian United Church officials visited the hospital to propose withdrawing funding and transferring funding responsibilities to the local Chinese church. After seeing the work that Dr. Chung and her colleagues achieved at the hospital and school, the Church officials decided to continue funding the hospital.

The Marion Barclay Hospital also ran clinics outside of the hospital compound. In Toishan there was "Baby Wellness Clinic" for the treatment of infants, while in Sun Wui there was a medical clinic run weekly by Dr. Chung and hospital staff. Among the hospital staff was her cousin, Cheung Meu Siu, a nurse.

=== During Japanese occupation ===
While away on her second furlough in July 1937, China was invaded by Japan. Dr. Chung returned to the Mission in early 1938 and tended to refugees who'd fled to the south as a result of the Canton Operation in late 1938, with some settling in and around the hospital. On March 28, 1939, while she was away in Hong Kong, Kongmoon was bombed by Japanese aircraft and the hospital's nursing quarters were directly struck. On March 29, Japanese troops arrived at Kongmoon's port and the city was occupied, while the Mission, as a foreign entity was not. No staff were killed in the attack but dozens of residents in the surrounding area were killed or wounded. The displaced and refugees converged on the hospital for shelter and safety. Dr Chung was kept busy vaccinating the crowds against cholera, smallpox and typhus, as well as treating patients with dysentery and malaria. As a foreign mission, the hospital had certain protections afforded to it by treaties. The hospital had at least one British flag painted on the roof of the compound, and the Mission's location was stated to Japan several months prior to the attack on Kongmoon. Since Japan was not at war with Canada or the UK at the time, the Japanese were charged with paying compensation to the Mission by the British Consulate-General of Guangzhou for the damage to the hospital. Japanese officials eventually paid $1600 in Guangzhou currency in June 1939. Shortly after this incident, United Church officials indicated their concern about the safety of their female missionaries, with the British diplomats eventually collecting most of the women from Kongmoon and taking them to Hong Kong. This left the hospital with only a few Canadian mission staff remaining, including Dr. Chung, while also on staff was the Chinese Dr. Annie (Shuk Yin) Wong, who joined the hospital in 1936. There were additional nurses hired with money from the salary of vacant doctor positions, and the hospital focused on providing basic services for patients. As time passed Dr. Chung continued to update the WMS about the hospital's operations and the conditions in Kongmoon under Japanese occupation. She wrote:

"Our hills have been stripped of all timber; I wish it were for as good a cause as fuel; our river front is piled high with trunks of young trees, whilst everywhere the wood problem grows more acute ... Folks have been more cautious in venturing out at all, as carriers and coolies [sic] are in demand everywhere..."

Despite the hardships at the hospital, there was a Christmas celebration in 1940, complete with prayers, singing and an appearance from Santa Claus.

==== Japanese at war with Allies ====
In December 1941, Japan invaded British holdings in the Pacific Theatre, including Hong Kong. Foreign missionaries were now considered enemy aliens. On December 19–20, the Japanese gathered the Catholic Maryknoll mission, the United Church mission, and British customs commissioner and harbour master, and placed them under house arrest in the home of Dr. Chung's colleagues, Mr. and Mrs. Broadfoot. Eventually the group was told they would be sent to Macau and they left on December 29. Dr. Chung did not inform the Japanese of her British Passport, and as such she was not required to leave Kongmoon. Dr. Chung refused to collaborate with the Japanese, and she, her mother and staff were expelled from the hospital compound. The Japanese also seized the hospitals ambulance and Red Cross food supplies.

Dr. Chung and her colleagues continued to provide dispensary services and ambulatory care out of a rented building in Kongmoon. By 1943 they had bought a three-story building in Kongmoon city to set up a clinic and dispensary. The Japanese conducted frequent searches of homes to look for signs of resistance or foreign agents, but they never discovered the clinic. Dr. Chung did not receive her salary from the WMS between 1941 and 1945 due to the war.

By September 1945, Japan had surrendered to the Allies and by October Marion Barclay had been cleared of Japanese forces by Chinese soldiers. Two of Dr. Chung's missionary colleagues, nurses Cairns and Issac returned to the hospital by the end of the year. The hospital resumed in-patient care, as well as teaching at the hospital's school.

=== Resumed civil war ===
After a few years back at the hospital, in May 1947 Dr. Chung left for her delayed furlough in Canada with her house mate, Dr. Wong. A Dr. Wallace McClure and his wife came to the hospital to take on Dr. Chung's and Dr. Wong's responsibilities while she was away. Dr. Chung arranged to have her colleague Dr. Wong, attend a year long fellowship at the Women's College Hospital in Toronto. While on furlough Dr. Chung continued to raise funds for the hospital. Meanwhile, in China, Communist and Nationalist forces resumed the Chinese Civil War that had lulled during the Japanese occupation. Dr. Chung returned to the hospital in August 1948, and Dr. W McClure and his wife took leave. As war in the north progressed, the Mission and its members discussed the feasibility of staying in Kongmoon. By 1949, several white missionaries left or prepared to leave, and it was assumed that Dr. Chung would stay at the hospital, as she did during the Japanese occupation. It was reported by Dr. W. Wallace that Dr. Chung said "no one asks me whether I am going to stay in the hospital or not." Dr. Chung continued to run the clinic that she and Dr. Wong had opened in Kongmoon city, attending it one to two days a week, and seeing up to 250 patients a day.

=== Communist era ===
The Communist revolution arrived in the Kongmoon area in November 1949. During the first few days of regime change the hospital saw decreased patient load, but otherwise remained busy. With the victory of the anti-imperialist Communists, Dr. Chung requested that the WMS redirect her salary to a Canadian account of hers. Soon there were only two Canadian WMS members in its South China Mission, Dr. Chung in Kongmoon and nurse Cairns in Guangzhou, who left by mid-1950. The United Church and WMS decided to dissolve the South China Mission and pass on administration and funding of the Mission's work to the Guangdong Synod. Dr. Wong returned from her fellowship at Women's College Hospital around this time.

After the expulsion of Dr. W McClure in late 1950, the hospital, its assets and administration were taken over by Communist authorities from the Guangdong Synod. Dr. Chung was made the superintendent of the Marion Barclay Hospital. A labour union was formed and there was a meeting denouncing imperialism at the hospital. Soon it was named the North Street People's Hospital. All evangelical activities and symbols in the hospital were removed, and staff were to attend political study groups. By 1952, Dr. Chung cut all ties to the United Church, refusing to accept her salary, even into her Canadian account. She told the WMS that she could not accept any funds, so that she could tell local officials that she was truly free of foreign connections While Dr. Chung initially was able to continue her work unimpeded, in March 1952 she became a target of the three-antis campaign and was accused of embezzling funds from UN relief agencies. Dr. Chung confided in a Christian colleague that she had not embezzled the funds but she wishes for the issue to be quickly resolved and she confessed at a district party committee. She paid the fine with money she had in a Hong Kong bank account. In 1954, Dr. Chung was exonerated and she was refunded the fine she paid, which she used to buy an X-ray machine for the hospital and pay for additional nurse training. Dr. Chung was honoured as a Model Worker in 1954 and 1956 and by 1957 she was receiving the maximum salary for a public servant at the time.

Dr. Chung continued to publish medical articles in Chinese language medical journals throughout this period, including in the Chinese Journal of Internal Medicine and the Chinese Journal of Pediatrics. On top of her hospital duties, Dr. Chung was also nominated to the Executive of Kongmoon City, becoming deputy chair. She was also a part of the executive of the Kongmoon Women's Committee, and she was a member of the provincial consultive conference.

== Final years ==
In the aftermath of the failure of the Great Leap Forward, the North Street People's Hospital sent out medical teams to rural areas surrounding Kongmoon. Despite the fact she was now in her sixties, Dr. Chung would still occasionally make the long journey to the countryside to treat patients. According to her colleague Dr. Guo, Dr. Chung was greeted as the "white-haired grandma" by villagers, and on her few visits hundreds would line up to see her. Although she tampered her beliefs to survive the anti-religious nature of the new Chinese state, Dr. Chung remained an elder in the local Kongmoon Church. Dr. Chung's mother, Yin Han became ill in 1965 and she took a month's leave from the hospital to care for her before she died.

Dr. Chung herself was soon afflicted with lung cancer, and died in her hospital residence on May 17, 1966. Chung was laid in state in the memorial hall of Zhongshan Park in Kongmoon for two days and one night. It was reported that there were approximately 300 wreaths at her funeral, and a large funeral procession to the crematorium was observed by hundreds who lined the streets to bid their respects to the doctor.

== Personal life and family ==
Victoria Chung was the eldest of six children. Her parents, Sing Noon (1863-1940s) and Yin Han (1874-1965) were both converts to Christianity and were from southern China. Her father, Sing Noon was from the village of Ng Chuen in Kaiping, arrived in British Columbia in 1881 to work on construction of the Canadian Pacific Railway. In 1884 he moved to Victoria and established a grocery store in Chinatown. Shortly after he converted to Christianity through a local Methodist mission school. In the 1890s, he returned to China and found employment in Guangzhou where he met his future wife. In 1896 Sing Noon paid to bring his wife Yin Han, to Canada, although the fee was later reimbursed since she was the wife of a merchant and thus was exempt from the Head Tax at that time. Sing Noon was a steward and board treasurer of the Chinese Methodist Church located on Fisgard Street.

Chung's mother, Yin Han was born in Fujian and educated at True Light Seminary in Guangzhou, before continuing her studies at age 16 at nearby Boji Medical School in the teaching wing of Canton Hospital. Yin Han gave birth to six children in Canada, only two of whom lived to adulthood. Between January and May 1900, Yin Han paid to board herself and Victoria at the Chinese Rescue Home to learn English and partake in evangelistic work. Yin Han returned to the home in November to give birth to her second child, Chung Yan Hing, later named Herbert. At this time the Chung family home was very crowded, and Yin Han was still working full time as a midwife in Chinatown, so she decided to board Victoria at the Home. Yin Han returned to give birth to twins in 1902. After the Chinese Exclusion Act was passed in 1923, Chung's parents and younger brother, Wilson, moved to join her in Kongmoon in 1925. Yin Han assisted at the Marion Barclay hospital providing midwifery and dispensary services.

Growing up Chung and her family attended the Chinese Methodist Church in Chinatown. Throughout her youth, Chung was involved with evangelistic activities at the Oriental Home. Chung and her mother were members of the Chinese Girls House Mission Band, a group that met each month for bible study and to learn about Christian missionary work worldwide. Chung served as the Band's treasurer, recording secretary and eventually as the Band's president. During these meetings there were lectures on medical missions and work in China.

During the Second World War, Chung's assets in Canada were seized by the Custodian of Enemy Property, as were the assets of most Canadians behind enemy lines during the war. Dr. Chung successfully filed for the return of her funds in 1947 while on furlough, totalling $1054.49. The WMS also awarded her back-pay for her years of missed salary during the war, $4183.33.

Although Chung could speak Cantonese fluently, she had little experience with written Chinese. During her career in China, she had to practise her written Chinese, often at night, while she took her clinical notes at the hospital in English.

At the age of 58, Chung adopted a 12-year-old boy named Songqia. Songqia and his biological mother had first stayed in the basement of Dr. Chung's home in 1949, and in 1955 his biological mother remarried and moved, allowing her Dr. Chung to adopt him.

== Honours and legacy ==
Honours: Model worker: 1954, 1956. Nominated as a National Cultural Hero in Education: 1957, 1959.

After her death, her estate was inherited by her cousin, Mei Siu, who quickly had to hide or destroy documents connecting Dr. Chung to Canada or Christianity. The day before Dr. Chung had died was the beginning of the Cultural Revolution and soon her former home was raided and Dr. Chung was accused of being an "imperialist black line person."

Dr. Chung's legacy was largely unrecognized for decades. In 1998 her memory was invoked by government and hospital officials in Kongmoon to convince doctors to take less money from rich clients and provide care to all. In 2008, John Price was provided with a newspaper clipping of an article about Dr. Chung, and for the next decade, he and Ningping Yu complied documents and interviews about her. Also in 2008, Dr. Chung's ashes were reinterned in a Christian ceremony.

Dr. Chung was celebrated in 2012 during the centenary of the hospital she worked at, now called the Jiangmen Central Hospital. A few years earlier, in 2010, a large bronze bust of Dr. Chung was placed in the main reception area of the hospital. Over one thousand people attended, including many overseas guests. An official delegation from Victoria, B.C., including councillor Charlayne Thornton-Joe attended, and a separate assembly focusing on Dr. Chung was also held.

In Victoria, December 8 was proclaimed Dr. Victoria Chung Day.

Dr. Chung had received a scholarship and additional funds from the Presbyterian Women's Missionary Society (WMS) for her university education, and while on her first furlough, Dr. Chung gifted the successor United Church with the equivalent of the funds spent on her education. The board of the WMS created a scholarship account, the Dr. Victoria Chung Scholarship, and it helped to fund the education of 163 students before the WMS was dissolved in 1962.

== Bibliography ==
- Price, John; Yu, Ningping (2019). A Woman in Between: Searching for Dr. Victoria Chung. Chinese Canadian Historical Society of British Columbia, UBC Initiative for Student Teaching and Research in Chinese Canadian Studies. ISBN 9780993659324.
- Wong, May Q. (2018). City in colour : rediscovered stories of Victoria's multicultural past. Canada: TouchWood Editions. pp. 219–230. ISBN 978-1-77151-285-5.
- Healey, Haley (2021). Flourishing and Free: More Stories of Trailblazing Women of Vancouver Island. Toronto, Canada: Heritage House Publishing Company Ltd. pp. 18–27. ISBN 978 1-77203-353-3.
