= Sarah Hunt =

Indigenous researcher, author and professor

Sarah Hunt (born 1976), also known as Tłaliłila’ogwa, is an Indigenous researcher, author and professor based in British Columbia, Canada. Hunt is a community-based researcher with an academic focus is on Indigenous politics, decolonial methodologies, and issues facing women, girls, and two-spirit people.

== Early life and education ==
Hunt was born in Victoria, British Columbia. Through her father she is Kwagiulth of the Kwakwakaʼwakw Nation and through her mother she has English and Ukrainian ancestry. Hunt grew up on- and off-reserve. She attended Spectrum Community School, in Victoria, British Columbia, graduating as co-valedictorian. She was a Miss Native Centre Princess, and very active in the Songhees community growing up.

Hunt completed both her B.A. in Women's Studies, and her M.A. at the University of Victoria. During her undergraduate studies she worked on several projects on Indigenous women in sex work in Vancouver and she worked as a youth outreach worker with the Urban Native Youth Association. In 2001, she started to work at the Justice Institute of British Columbia, researching sexual exploitation of Indigenous peoples and women.

In 2014, she completed her Ph.D. at Simon Fraser University. Post-graduation, she was the Scholar-in-Residence at Vancouver Island University and postdoctoral fellow at the National Collaborating Centre for Aboriginal Health. She became an assistant professor of Critical Indigenous Geography at the University of British Columbia in 2015. In 2020, Hunt took a position as an Assistant Professor and Canada Research Chair at the University of Victoria.

== Academic career ==
Hunt is currently a Canada Research Chair and assistant professor in Indigenous Political Ecology at the University of Victoria in the Department of Environmental Studies. She is a co-editor for the academic journal Acme (journal)|Acme: An International Journal for Critical Geographies, and is the Secretary of Indigenous Peoples Specialty Group of the American Association of Geographers. and she is currently writing a book manuscript under the University of Manitoba Press.

Before moving to the University of Victoria, Hunt worked in the Department of Geography and the Institute for Critical Indigenous Studies as an assistant professor at the University of British Columbia. Throughout her academic career, Hunt has had a significant contributions in Indigenous political ecology scholarship. Her research and scholarship have been published and included in several anthologies and scholarly journals including Atlantis, Geography Compass, and The Winter We Danced: Voices from the Past, the Future, and the Idle No More Movement.

== Research ==
Hunt's research builds on her earlier community-based research and work in Vancouver around issues of violence, self-determination, gender, and justice. She has conducted research around the issues of sex work, youth sexual exploitation and human trafficking and she examines these issues through intersectional and decolonial approaches. Her research primarily focuses now on decolonial Indigenous methodologies and political ecologies rooted in an Indigenous perspective. Most recently, Hunt's research has centered on the understandings of justice in an Indigenous lens through the land-based cultural practice and embodied knowledge engagement of Coastal Indigenous peoples.

== Other work and publications ==
Before working in academia, Hunt worked as a program coordinator, community-based researcher, and an educator who addressed issues around violence in Indigenous communities through promoting community capacity building. In addition to writing and co-writing many journal articles, Hunt has contributed her knowledge, research, and scholarship to the academic and greater community through several reports, book chapters, book reviews, talks, media articles, and blogs. In 2013, Hunt hosted a TedX talk in Victoria on the topic of colonial violence and the tension between law and violence.

== Awards and honours ==
Hunt received the Governor General's Gold Medal in 2014 for her doctorate dissertation titled, "The dynamics of law, violence and space through the frequently unheard perspectives of indigenous people working to address violence in communities across B.C."

In 2017 she was awarded the Glenda Laws Award for Social Justice from the American Association of Geographers.

== Critiques and advocacy ==
Hunt's academic and community-based research have contributed to understandings of decolonial and intersectional approaches to sex work, Indigenous political ecologies, and gender justice. Notable critiques and debates advanced in Hunt's work include her argument that there is tension between Canadian law and colonial violence. Hunt has been an advocate for the decolonization of sex work and decolonial, Indigenous approaches to political ecology. She is an ally to sex workers and has advocated for the confrontation of stigma of as well as the strengthening of relationships between Indigenous community members and Indigenous sex workers. Hunt works to increase sex worker's self-determination and safety through her advocacy of emphasizing Indigenous ways of knowing and being such as agency, freedom of mobility, reciprocity, and responsibility while uplifting the voices of sex workers themselves. Hunt's unique perspective having experience in both academic and community-based research have allowed for significant advancement in Indigenous scholarship.

== Journal publications ==
- Clark N, Hunt S. Navigating the Crossroads: Exploring young women's experiences of health using an intersectional framework. In: Hankivsky O, editor. Health Inequities in Canada: Intersectional Frameworks and Practices. Vancouver: UBC Press; 2011.
- Clark N, Hunt S, Jules G, Good T. Ethical Dilemmas in Community-Based Research: Working with Vulnerable Youth in Rural Communities. J Acad Ethics. 2010;8(4):243–52.
- de Leeuw S, Hunt S. Unsettling decolonizing geographies. Geogr Compass. 2018;12(7):1–14.
- Holmes C, Hunt S, Piedalue A. Violence, colonialism, and space: Towards a decolonizing dialogue. Acme. 2015;14(2):539–70.
- Hunt S. Embodying Self Determination: Beyond the Gender Binary. In: Greenwood M, de Leeuw S, Lindsay NM, editors. Determinants of Indigenous Peoples’ Health, Second Edition: Beyond the Social. Second. Toronto: CSP Books; 2018.
- Hunt, S. Decolonizing sex work: Developing an Intersectional Indigenous Approach. In E. van der Meulen, E.M. Durisin and V. Love (Eds), Selling sex: Experience, advocacy, and research on sex work in Canada (pp. 82–100). Vancouver: University of British Columbia Press; 2013.
- Hunt S. Ontologies of Indigeneity: The politics of embodying a concept. Cult Geogr. 2014;21(1):27–32.
- Hunt SE. Witnessing the Colonialscape: Lighting the Intimate Fires of Indigenous Legal Pluralism. 2014.
- Hunt S. Representing Colonial Violence: trafficking, sex work, and the violence of law. Vol. 37, Atlantis: Critical Studies in Gender, Culture & Social Justice. 2016. p. 25–39.
- Hunt S, Holmes C. Everyday decolonization: Living a decolonizing queer politics. J Lesbian Stud. 2015;19(2):154–72.
- Hunt/Tłaliłila’ogwa, S., & Farrales, M. (2024). Against abstraction: Reclaiming and reorienting to embodied collective knowledges of solidarity. Environment and Planning D: Society and Space, 42(3), 422-441.
- Hunt/Tłaliłila’ogwa, S. (2025). (Re)Making Native Space: Locating Gendered Geographies of Law, Territoriality, and Dispossession in the Colonial Archive. Annals of the American Association of Geographers, 115(9), 2134–2148.
