= Oak Bay High School =

École Secondaire Oak Bay High School
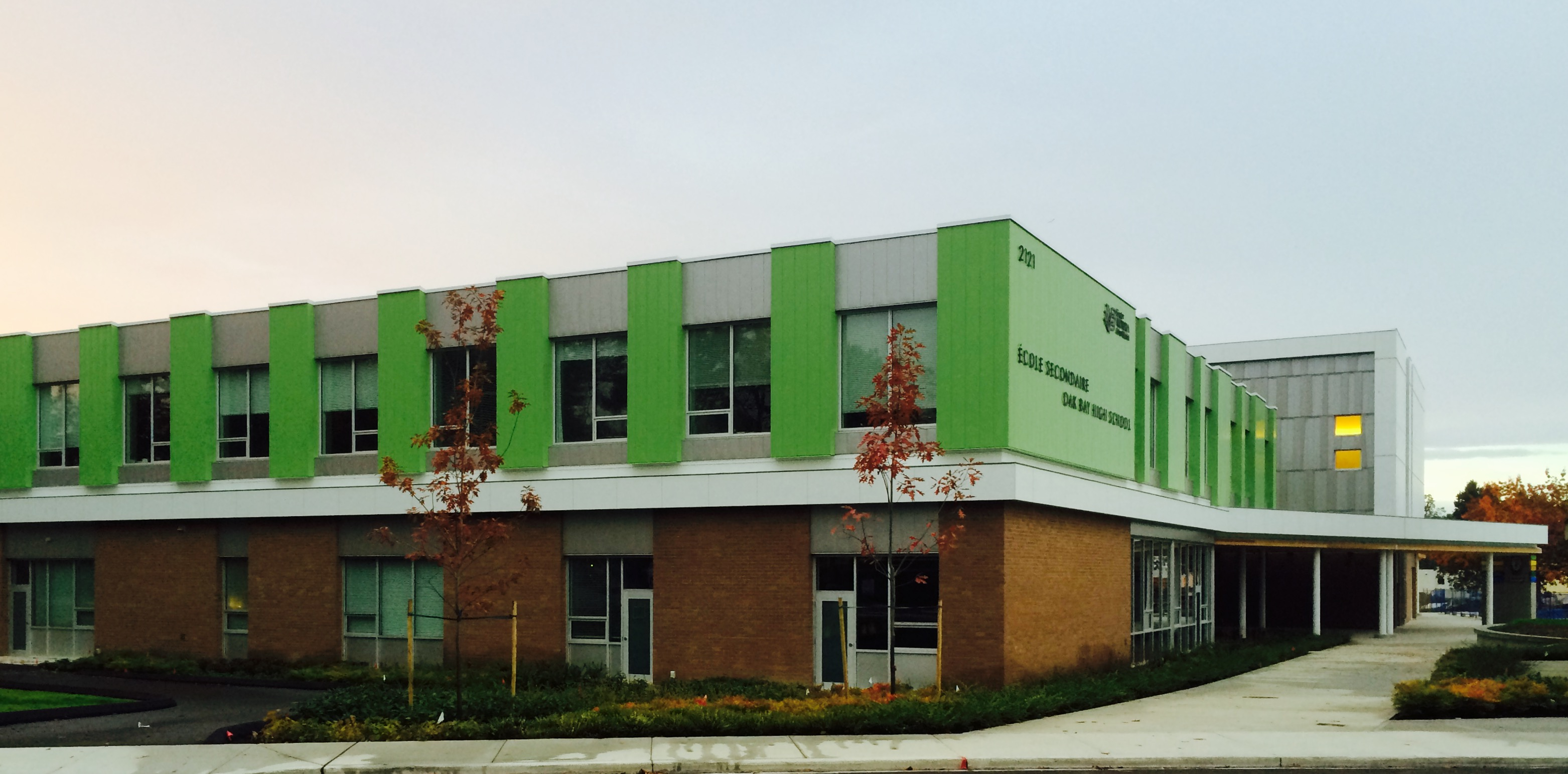
- Oak Bay High School, street facade, 2015

Location
- 2121 Cadboro Bay Rd. Victoria, British Columbia, V8R 5G4; Canada/USA; 48.43229°N 123.3174°W

Information
- School type: Public, high school
- Motto: De Humanitate (Of humanity)
- Founded: 1915
- School board: School District 61 Greater Victoria
- Principal: Mr. Shawne Bouldinger
- Staff: 1080
- Grades: 9-12
- Enrollment: 1367 (2022-2023)
- Language: English, French
- Campus: Urban
- Area: Oak Bay
Colour
- Mascot: Goone The Acorn
- Team name: Barbarians, Bays, Breakers, Barbers
- Website: www.oakbay.sd61.bc.ca

École Secondaire Oak Bay High School is a high school in the Greater Victoria School District and is located in Oak Bay, British Columbia, Canada. The enrollment is approximately 1,400 students attending in grades 9 to 12 in both regular and French immersion programs. The school moved into new facilities on the same site in 2015. The construction took roughly 2.5 years.

== History and facilities ==
The first high school in Oak Bay was opened in 1915 where the Oak Bay Municipal Hall now stands. This school, however, quickly became over-crowded and was replaced by what was the East Building at the school's present location on Cranmore Road in 1929. Oak Bay Junior High school was constructed on the west side of the school property opening in 1953. The two schools were amalgamated in the late 1970s and the buildings named "West" and "East".

When the province renamed all its high schools 'Secondary School', Oak Bay High School, Victoria High School, and Esquimalt High School were the only schools to retain 'High School' as part of their names.

In October 2011, plans were announced to replace the existing school with a new $50 million facility to accommodate up to 1,300 students, including 100 international students, as well as a Neighbourhood Learning Centre. The existing 1957-era gymnasium as be converted into a performing arts theatre with support space for both school and community use. Construction began in the summer of 2013. The new building was completed for the start of the 2015–2016 school year. The site work and removal of the old buildings was completed in 2016. By September 2015, the entire main building of the school had been finished construction, though the artificial turf soccer field, and the new rugby pitch, continued construction well into 2021.

== Athletics ==
Oak Bay has a large athletics program; its teams compete in basketball (Bays), rugby (Barbarians), cross country running, track and field, soccer, volleyball (Barbers), field hockey, badminton, tennis, cycling, sailing, skiing & snowboarding and cricket. Oak Bay's Track and Field team has won over 1 Provincial titles and is a perennial island and city champion.

== Fine Arts ==
Oak Bay has a Fine Arts program, including choirs, bands, a string orchestra and multiple dance troupes. Oak Bay Secondary puts on an annual musical production, run and performed by the senior students. Oak Bay High School also hosts an arts program, including, from 1996 to 2006, the Oak Bay Community Theater.

== Notable alumni ==
- Pierre Berton, author
- Mark Chao, actor and singer
- Geoff Courtnall, NHL player
- Russ Courtnall, NHL player
- Anna-Marie de Zwager, Olympic rower
- Vicki Gabereau, Canadian radio and television personality
- Ken Kirzinger, stuntman and actor
- Phil Mack, rugby player and coach
- Iain McCaig, Illustrator and conceptual designer
- Kiril Petkov, prime minister of Bulgaria
- Jim Rutledge, professional golfer
- Roger Stanier, microbiologist
- Adam Straith, soccer player
- Simon Thomas, soccer player
- Deborah Kara Unger, actress
- Roy Henry Vickers, First Nations artist
- Andrew Weaver, MLA and Green Party of British Columbia leader
- Mark Wyatt, rugby player
- Emily Carr, artist
