= Luke Burton-Krahn =

Canadian gridiron football player (born 1999)

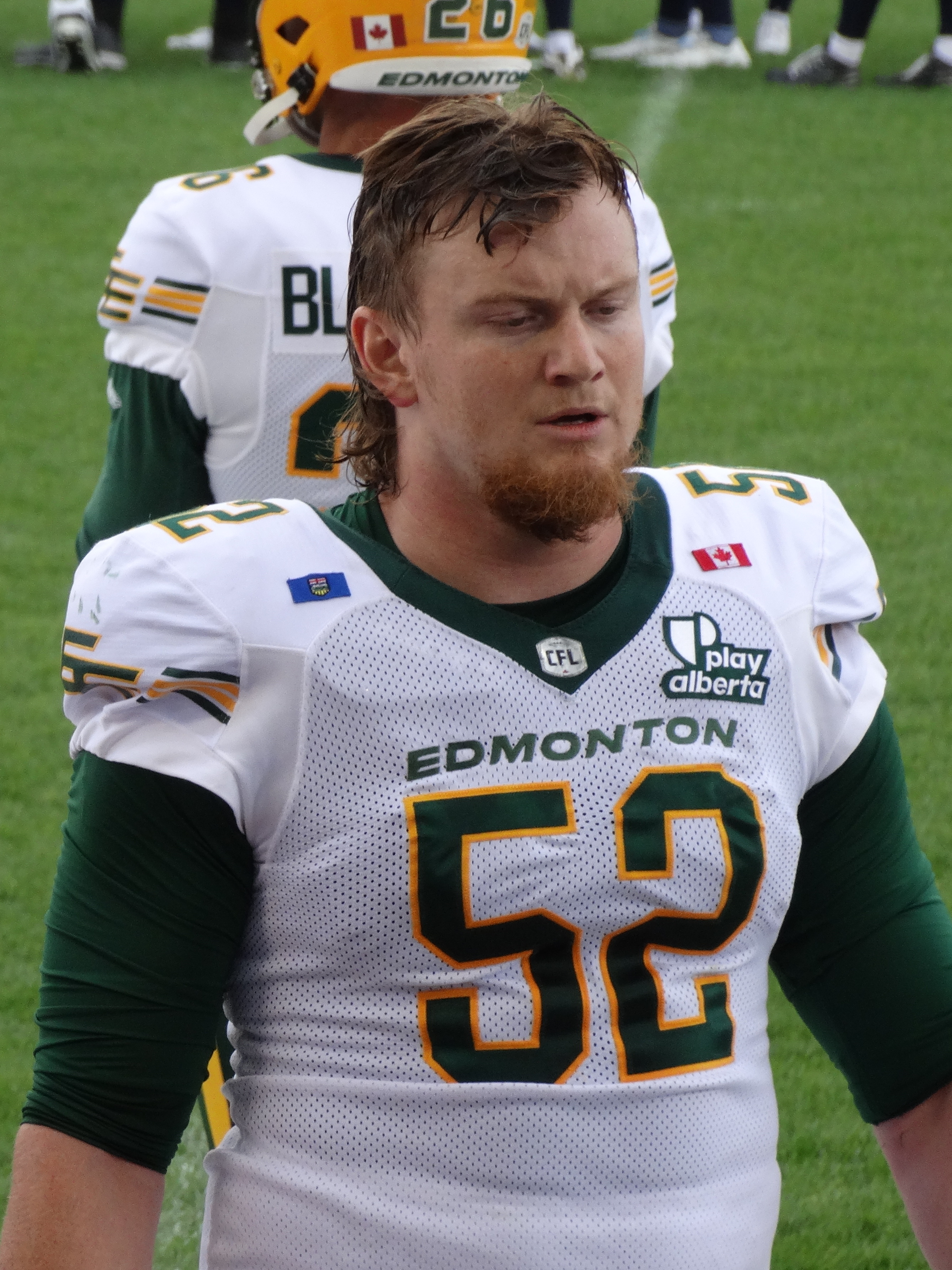
- Burton-Krahn with the Edmonton Elks in 2025

No. 52 – Edmonton Elks
- Positions: Long snapper, Defensive lineman
- Roster status: 6-game injured list
- CFL status: National

Personal information
- Born: May 7, 1999 (age 27); Victoria, British Columbia, Canada
- Listed height: 6 ft 0 in (1.83 m)
- Listed weight: 237 lb (108 kg)

Career information
- High school: Esquimalt
- University: British Columbia
- CFL draft: 2023: 3rd round, 23rd overall pick

Career history
- 2023–present: Edmonton Elks

Awards and highlights
- Grey Cup champion (2026)
- Stats at CFL.ca

Luke Burton-Krahn (born May 7, 1999) is a Canadian professional football long snapper and defensive lineman for the Edmonton Elks of the Canadian Football League (CFL). He played U Sports football at the University of British Columbia.

== Early life and university ==
Burton-Krahn played rugby at Esquimalt High School and for the Victoria Spartans. He went on to attend the University of British Columbia and play four seasons for the Thunderbirds as a defensive lineman and long snapper. In 26 career games, Burton-Krahn tallied 60 total tackles, four tackles for loss, two sacks, and one forced fumble.

== Professional career ==
Burton-Krahn was drafted in the third round, 23rd overall, by the Edmonton Elks in the 2023 CFL draft and signed with the team on May 8, 2023.

Burton-Krahn played in the first three games of the regular season before being moved to the six-game injured list on June 28, 2023. On September 24, 2023, Burton-Krahn was moved from the six-game injured list to the practice roster. He played in the final two games of the season after returning from injury. Burton-Krahn finished the season with six special teams tackles.
