= Victoria College, British Columbia =

Victoria College
- Motto: Tuum est (Latin)
- Motto in English: It is up to you
- Active: 1903–1915; (Note: From 1915 to 1921, Victoria College suspended post-secondary operations.); 1921–1963
- Affiliations: McGill University (1903–1915); University of British Columbia (1921–1963)
- Location: Victoria, British Columbia, Canada
- Campus: Urban
- Colours: Red, gold, blue

Victoria College was an affiliated college based in Victoria, British Columbia, Canada. Founded in 1903, it was the first post-secondary institution established in British Columbia, and served as the predecessor to the University of Victoria. As a result, the history and traditions of the institution are perpetuated by the University of Victoria.

It was established in 1903 as an affiliated college of McGill University based at Victoria High School. Victoria College suspended operations when the University of British Columbia (UBC) opened to the public in 1915. Victoria College resumed operations in 1921 at Craigdarroch Castle, as an affiliate of UBC. An influx in enrolment following the Second World War led the institution to move to a new location in the Lansdowne area of Saanich. It continued to operate as an affiliated college until 1963 when it was reorganized into an independent institution, the University of Victoria.

== History ==
=== McGill affiliate (1903–1915) ===
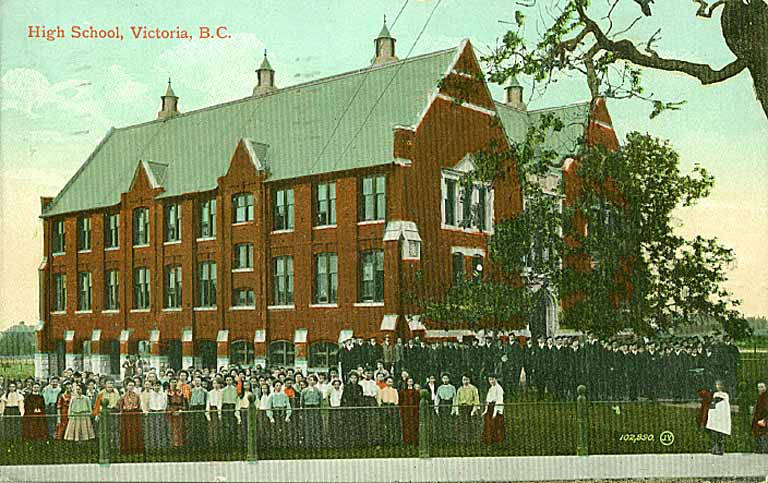
Victoria High School in 1912. The first iteration of Victoria College shared facilities with the high school.

Victoria College was a two-year college which provided students in Victoria, British Columbia with post-secondary education. Between the years 1903 and 1915, Victoria College was affiliated with McGill University, offering first- and second-year McGill courses in Arts and Science. Administered locally by the Victoria School Board, the college was an adjunct to Victoria High School and shared its facilities. Both institutions were under the direction of a single Principal, E.B. Paul from 1903 to 1908; and S.J. Willis from 1908 to 1915. After the University of British Columbia opened to the public in 1915, the college was forced to suspend post-secondary operations.

=== UBC affiliate (1921–1963) ===
In 1920, as a result of local demands, Victoria College began the second stage of its development, reborn as an affiliated institution of the University of British Columbia. Though still administered by the Victoria School Board, the college was now completely separated from Victoria High School, moving September 27, 1921, into Craigdarroch Castle. The institution was opened as a two-year institution, allowing students to complete the first two years of their bachelor's degree at Victoria College, before completing it at UBC. The institution was managed under principals E.B. Paul, and his successor, P.H. Elliott, providing scholarly instruction in first- and second-year arts and science.

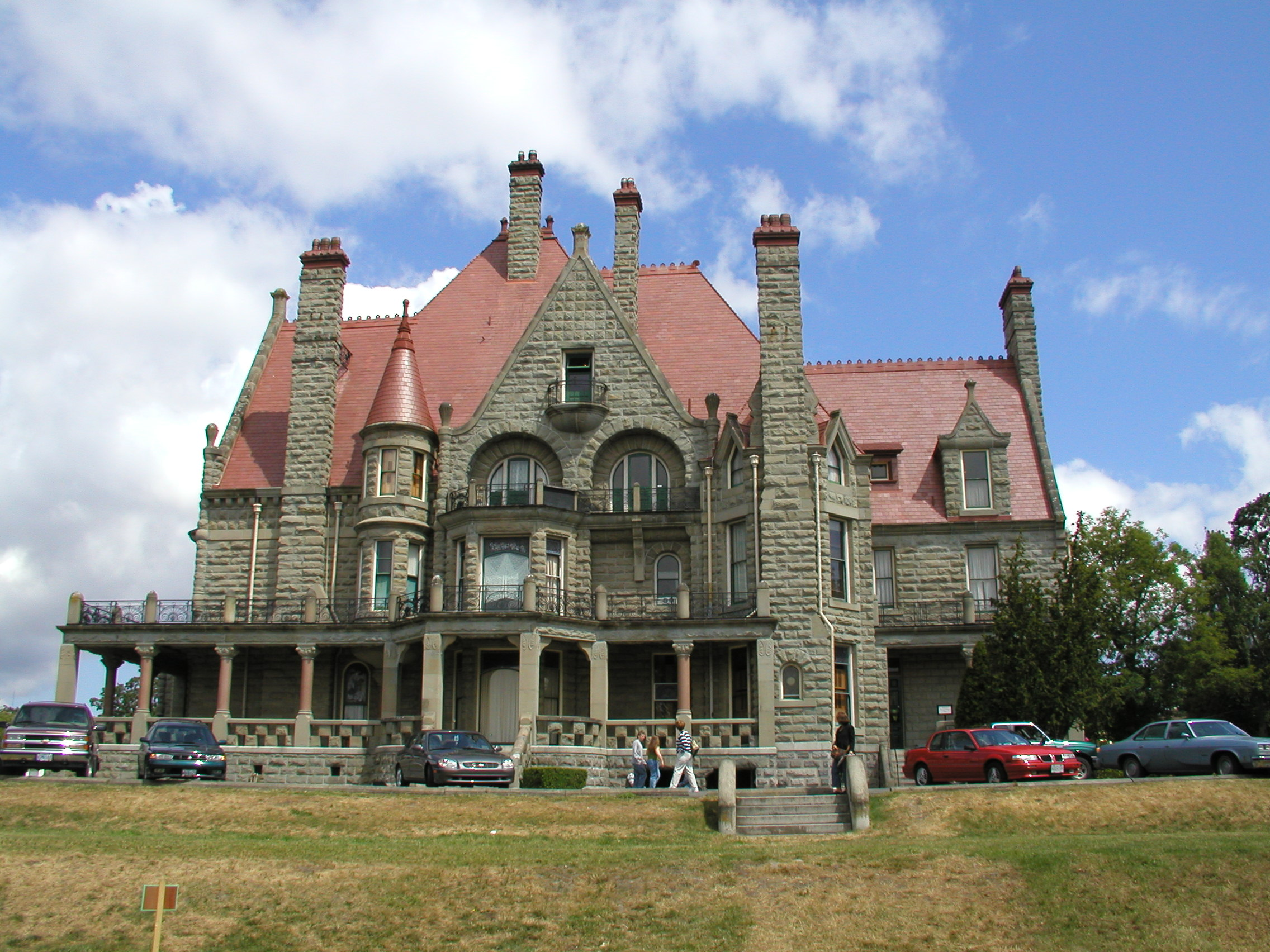
Craigdarroch Castle

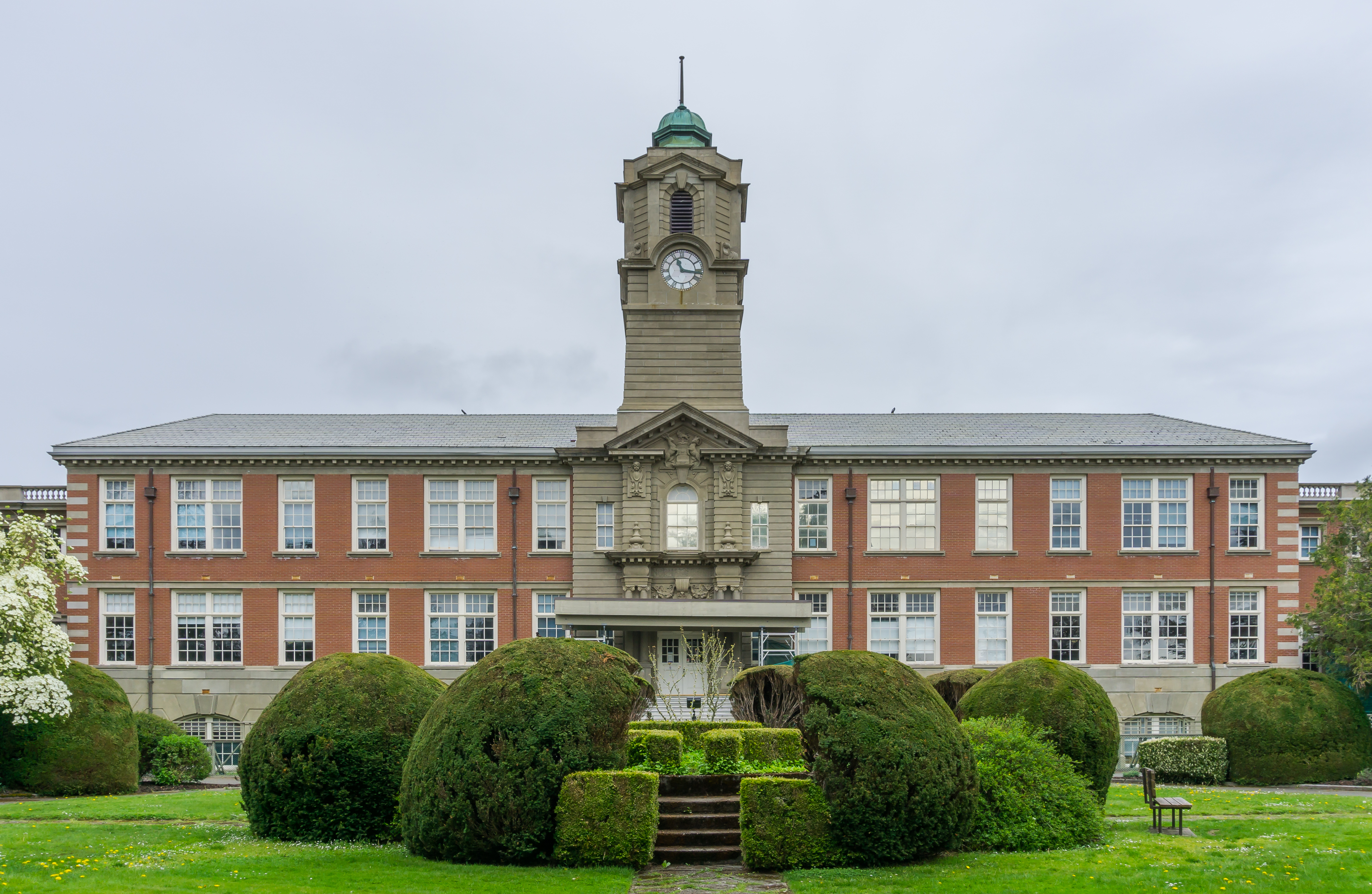
Young building

Victoria College was based at Craigdarroch Castle from 1921 to 1946. In 1946, the college moved to the provincial normal school building in Uplands (presently the Young building at Camosun College's Lansdowne campus).

Principal of Victoria College, J.M. Ewing, and his successor, W.H. Hickman, helped manage the institution's growth following the Second World War, as well as its later transition from an affiliated institution into an independent institution. During this period, the college was governed by the Victoria College Council, representative of the University of British Columbia, the Greater Victoria School Board, and the provincial Department of Education. The first major change to the institution during this period occurred in 1946, when the college was forced by postwar enrolment to move from Craigdarroch to the Lansdowne campus of the Provincial Normal School (presently a part of Camosun College Lansdowne campus). The provincial normal school was later merged with Victoria College in 1956, becoming the college's Faculty of Education. Late during this period, 115-hectare (284-acre) of land at Gordon Head was acquired by Victoria College, with the co-operation of the Department of National Defence and the Hudson's Bay Company.

The University of British Columbia later authorized its bachelor's degrees to be awarded at Victoria College. The first students that completed their studies entirely in Victoria were awarded UBC bachelor's degrees from the college in 1961. In 1963, Victoria College was reorganized through a charter as the University of Victoria, becoming an independent university.

== Traditions ==
=== Athletics ===
Victoria College students were active in many different sports and athletic activities. The warm, temperate climate of Victoria allows for extended sporting seasons and little rain. The rivers and ocean around Victoria provided excellent opportunities for rowing and sailing teams. The two sports continue to be popular sports at the University of Victoria.

=== Fight Song ===
Notable among a number of songs commonly played and sung at various events such as commencement and convocation, and athletic games is 'Rack and Ruin' a reminder of the tradition of the founding Victoria College. The Fight Song is still sung by the University of Victoria rowing club and soccer teams.

Rack and Ruin,
Blood and Gore,
Victoria College
Evermore!

== Faculty and staff ==
The staff of Victoria College started small and catered to the community. At its founding, it including a staff of just two faculty members, with the inaugural class consisting of four women and three men. The students and faculty members continued to steadily grow over the course of the first half of the twentieth-century.

== Notable alumni ==
- Jim Coleman (1911–2001), Canadian sports journalist, writer and press secretary
- Frances Kelsey (1914–2015), Canadian pharmacologist and physician who prevented the approval of thalidomide in the United States
