= Craigflower Manor and Schoolhouse =

National Historic Sites of Canada located in View Royal, British Columbia

Coordinates: 48.452649°N 123.421617°W

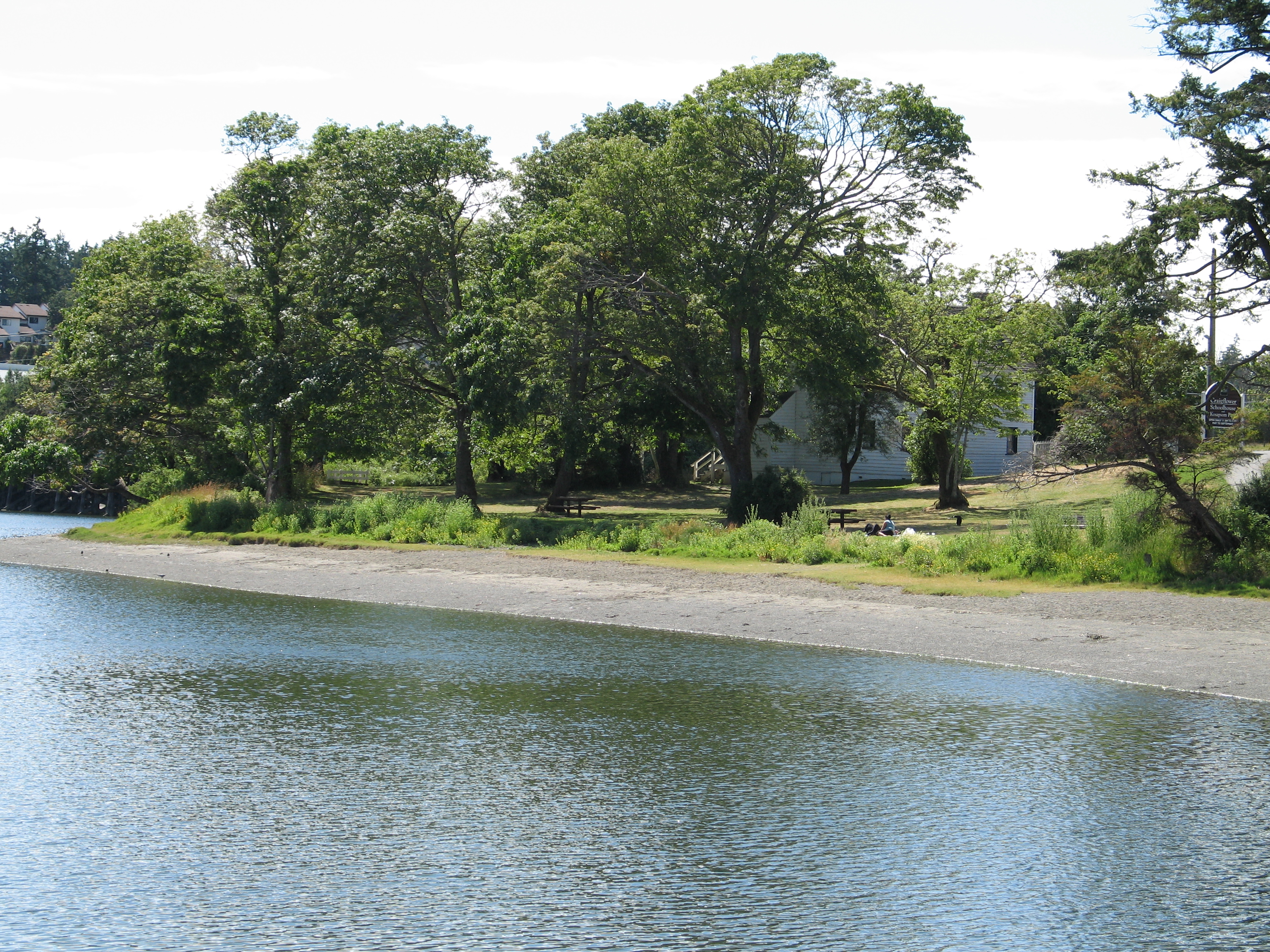
- Craigflower Farm from a distance.
- Interactive map of Craigflower Manor and Schoolhouse
- Type: Manor; schoolhouse; agricultural community
- Etymology: The Craigflower Estate in Scotland
- Location: View Royal (Manor) and Saanich (Schoolhouse), just north of the Craigflower Bridge at Admirals Road and Craigflower Road in Greater Victoria, British Columbia, Canada

History
- Founded: 1853
- Founder: Puget Sound Agricultural Company
- Built: 1853–1856

Site notes
- Architectural style: Georgian Revival
- Governing body: Parks Canada
- Website: Craigflower Manor archived

National Historic Site of Canada
- Designated: 1975

The Craigflower Manor and Craigflower Schoolhouse are National Historic Sites of Canada located in View Royal, British Columbia (the Manor) and Saanich (the Schoolhouse) near Victoria. The centerpiece of each historic site is a 19th-century building — a manor and schoolhouse commissioned by the Hudson's Bay Company to provide education and lodging for their employees in the agricultural community of Craigflower Farm. The two buildings are sited on the water, 200 metres apart, on either side of the Gorge Waterway, now spanned here by the Craigflower Bridge. The buildings have served as a focal point for the community into the modern era; they remain open to the public today as museums devoted to the colonial history of Victoria.

The sites also have archaeological merit, encompassing three distinct periods, and types, of human habitation which span thousands of years. The existing structures have historical and cultural value, and are among the last examples of their kind in Canada. These factors combine to make these two sites National Historic Sites, and they have been given government protection for the public trust.

== Site history ==
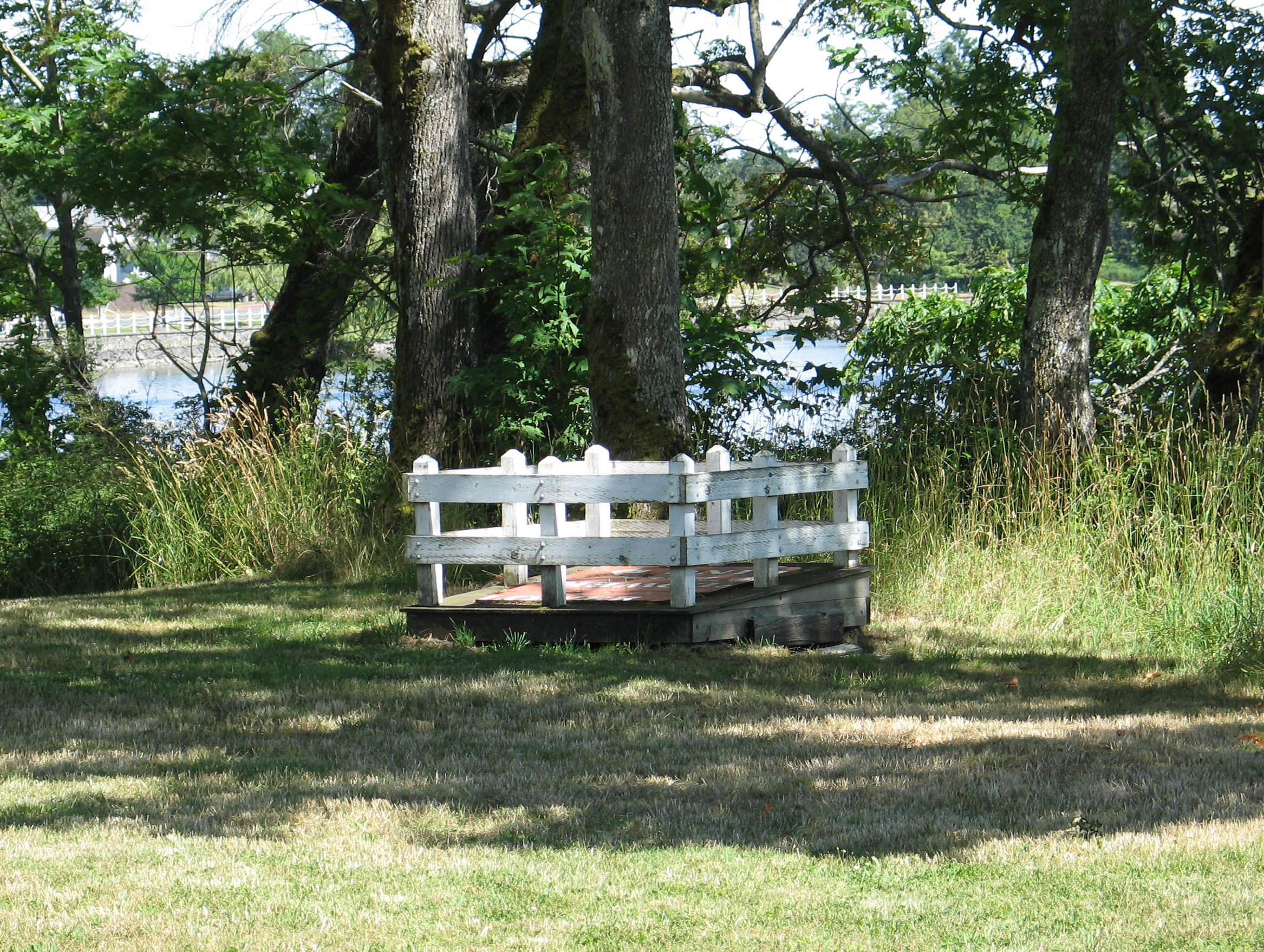
One of the pits left by the 1995 UVic dig on the site, preserved for future excavation.

The land in the area was formed during the last ice age in North America, approximately 13,000 years ago, when receding glaciers carved a deep gouge into the earth, which became a number of small lakes and streams. Over time, these lakes rejoined the ocean, becoming a salt-water inlet known today as the Gorge waterway, which the indigenous people call "Kosapsom". The Lekwungen, a Coast Salish tribe and ancestors of the modern Esquimalt and Songhees First Nations, settled in the area, calling the whole region "Camossung", after the legend of a girl they believed was turned to stone there.

Archaeologists working in the Gulf of Georgia, Vancouver Island, and the Lower Mainland have identified several distinct periods of cultural activity, known as "culture types" in the region. The site at Craigflower Farm exhibits three of these culture types, known as "Locarno Beach", "Gulf of Georgia" and "Historic". The "Historic" culture type refers to the colonial settlement of the area, and is contiguous with the European colonization; a majority of the artifacts recovered from the site have been dated to this period.

The other two periods of human habitation are discernible mainly by the presence of a large shell midden on the site; testifying to the abundant shellfish and game in the area. The earliest of the periods, the "Locarno Beach" type, used many different types of stone tools, including microblades, adzes, and other shaped or sharpened objects. The next culture type, dating from around 2500 years ago and known as the "Gulf of Georgia" type, is characterized by an increased use of bone tools, such as wedges and awls made from antlers, as well as different kinds of wood. This culture type's presence on the site ends with the arrival of Europeans, and the colonization of Vancouver Island — altogether, around 1000 indigenous artifacts were recovered from the site during two separate archaeological digs.

Both the manor and the schoolhouse were part of a settlement known as Craigflower Farm, which was one of Western Canada's first farming communities. Established in 1853 by the Puget Sound Agricultural Company, a subsidiary of the Hudson's Bay Company, the farm was to supply fresh produce to the nearby Fort Victoria, and to aid in settlement of lower Vancouver Island. The farm was named after Craigflower Estate in Scotland which was owned by Andrew Colville, Governor of the Hudson's Bay Company from 1852 to 1856. The land for the farm, was purchased from the Esquimalt First Nation (recorded as the "Kosapsom" on the treaty) in 1850, who relocated nearby.

== Craigflower Schoolhouse ==
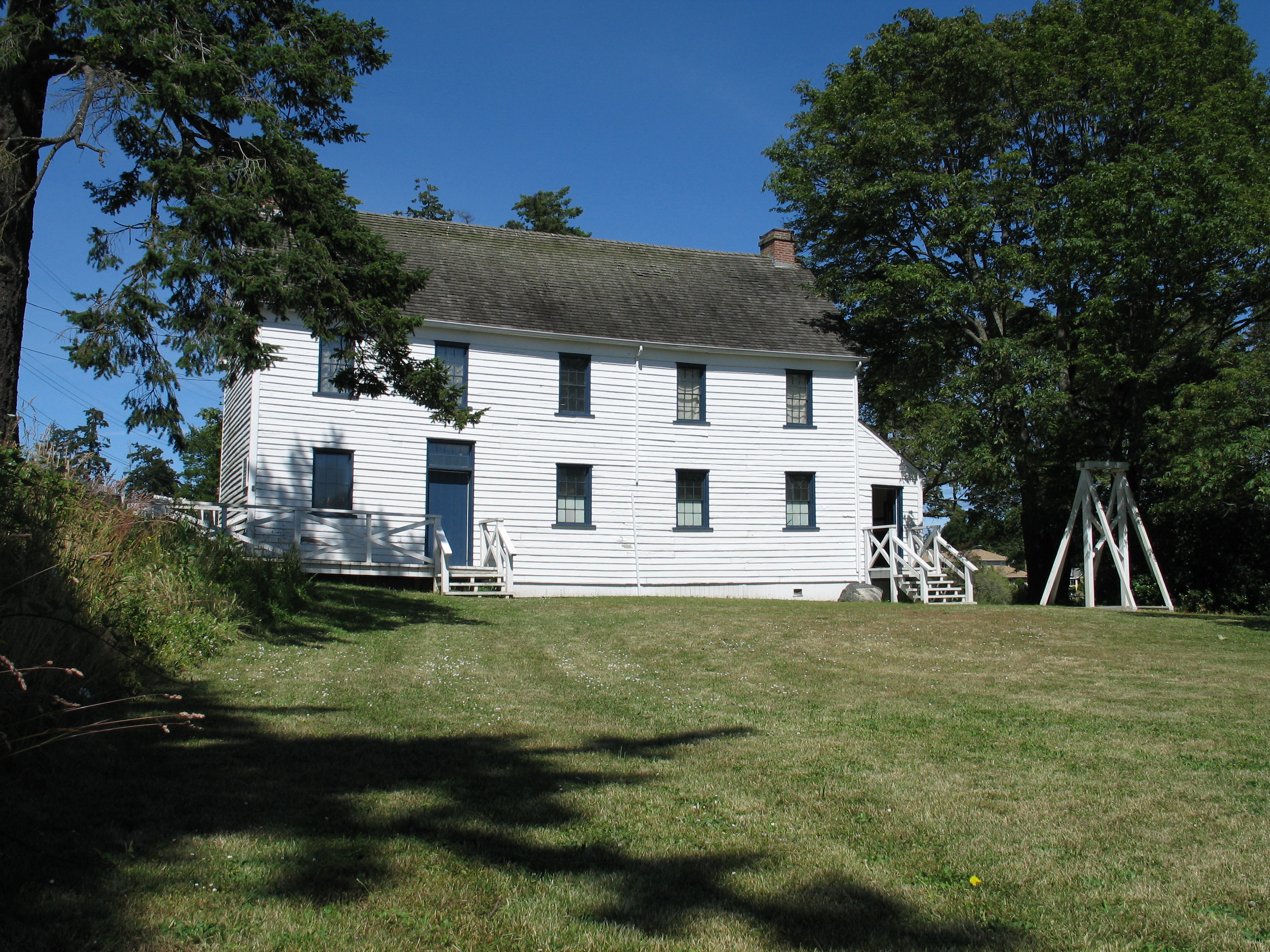
Craigflower Schoolhouse, viewed from the front. The original school bell is visible on the right.

Originally called Maple Point School, the schoolhouse was commissioned by first farm director, Kenneth McKenzie, to provide education for the children of farm employees. This was to be the third school constructed in the colony of Vancouver Island, following Governor James Douglas' call "to give a proper moral and religious training to the children of the settlers who are growing up in ignorance and the utter neglect of all their duties to God and society." The need was judged to be most severe for children of Protestant denomination, as Roman Catholics received (until 1851) "very able and zealous" instruction from a priest from the Society des Oblats. Construction was commenced, using timber milled on the farm, in August 1854 and continued until late February 1855. The first students took classes there in March of the same year, and were charged a fee of between 30 shillings and 1 pound.

The two-story building was built in Georgian Revival style, and boasted a single schoolroom on the first floor, as well as six rooms for the teacher, their family, and student boarders from other parts of Vancouver Island. A large brick fireplace, as well as a stove, provided heating for the building, and a bell salvaged from the wrecked steamship Major Tompkins was hung in the yard to call students to class. Initially, the school was accessible from the main part of the farm only by boat, but the 1856 completion of the first Craigflower bridge linked the two parts of the farm together.

The schoolhouse became the focal point of social and religious events on the farm, and saw continuous use until 1872 when town council neglected to provide funding for Victoria's schools. However, Education Act amendments returned the school to operation soon after, and in 1873 education was made mandatory for students aged seven to 14. The school continued to operate until 1911, when it was replaced by the second Craigflower school, built across the road. The current school, called Craigflower Elementary School, was built in 1964 to replace the aging 1911 building. The schoolhouse, however, was converted into a museum in 1931 and run by a local service club until 1975 when the provincial Historical Parks board acquired it and restored the structure. It was briefly run as a museum by The Land Conservancy of British Columbia in public trust — it is the oldest surviving schoolhouse in Western Canada, though it is often erroneously referred to as "the first school built in British Columbia". The Schoolhouse is now the home of the Hallmark Heritage Society, The Capital Regional District's oldest heritage preservation organization, and is open to the public for special presentations during the summer.

Having only one classroom, it may be considered a one-room schoolhouse.

== Craigflower Manor ==
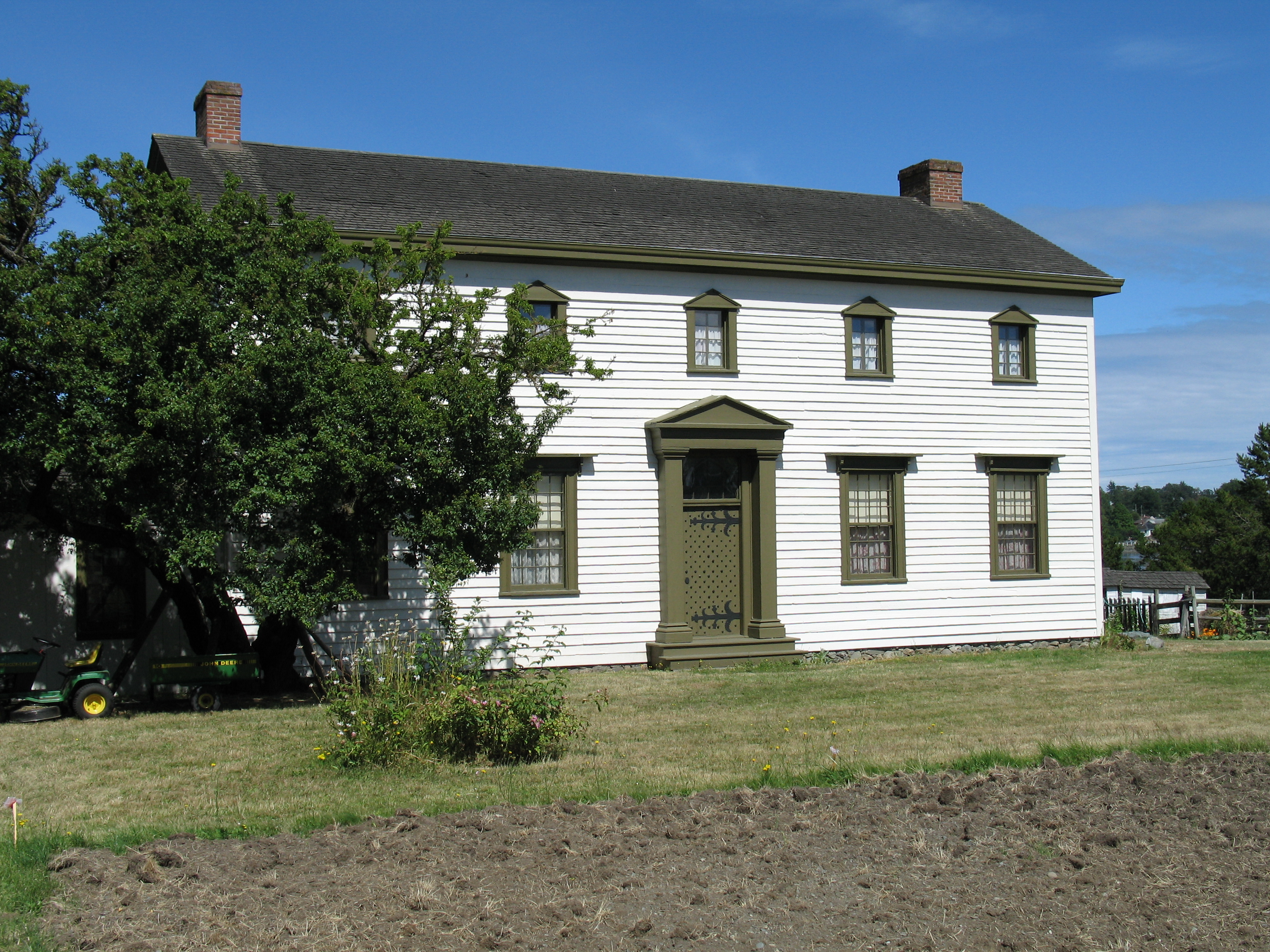
Craigflower manor, as seen from the front. A fallow field is visible in the foreground.

The manor house was built shortly after the completion of the schoolhouse, to serve as a home and office for the management of the Craigflower farm, and their family. The house was constructed as a Georgian Revival version of a Scottish manor house, at the request of Kenneth McKenzie's wife, Agnes. The foundation was laid in 1853, prior to the McKenzies' arrival, and was completed in May 1856.

A grand, two-story structure, the manor was second only to the first Government House in elegance. The building boasted a dining room, sitting room, office, music room, kitchen, and four bedrooms for the large McKenzie family. Heat was provided by several fireplaces, serviced by two large brick chimneys. The manor was used as lodging up until 1922, when the Hudson's Bay Company converted it into a community centre. It was purchased by Jean & Jerry Thompson and after being restored it became a bed & breakfast, before being sold to the government in 1965 by the Thompson family. As the building is the earliest, and one of the few remaining, examples of its type in Western Canada, it was extensively restored before 1967 by the Thompson family before being run as a museum by the previous owners( Jean & Jerry Thompson) who are solely responsible for saving the building and making it into a historical landmark which is currently leased by the Highland Games Society.

== See also ==
- Coast Salish peoples
- Colony of Vancouver Island
- Colony of British Columbia (1866–1871)
