= Michiel Horn =

Canadian professor and historian (born 1939)

Michiel Horn FRSC
- Born: Michiel Steven Daniel Horn; September 3, 1939 (age 87); Baarn, Netherlands
- Spouse: Cornelia Schuh (m. 1984)

Academic background
- Education: University of British Columbia; University of Toronto
- Thesis: The League for Social Reconstruction (1969)
- Doctoral advisor: Ramsay Cook

Academic work
- Discipline: History
- Institutions: York University

Michiel Steven Daniel Horn (Note: Pronounced /ˈmaɪkəl/ MY-kəl.) FRSC (born 1939) is a Canadian historian who serves as a professor emeritus at Glendon College, York University.

== Life and career ==
Horn was born on September 3, 1939, in Baarn, Netherlands. His family migrated to Canada from the Netherlands in 1952, settling in Victoria, British Columbia. He graduated from Victoria High School in 1956.

Horn holds a Bachelor of Arts degree from the University of British Columbia, and Master of Arts and Doctor of Philosophy degrees from the University of Toronto. He is currently a professor emeritus of history and university historian at Glendon College, York University, in Toronto, where he has worked since 1968.

Horn has been married to Cornelia Maria Schuh, a lawyer and civil servant with the Ontario provincial government, since December 29, 1984. They have two sons, Daniel and Patrick.

In 2002, Horn was inducted into the Royal Society of Canada in Academy II (Social Sciences).

== Bibliography ==
- Horn, Michiel, ed. (1972). The Dirty Thirties: Canadians in the Great Depression. Toronto: Copp Clark.
- Horn, Michiel; Ronald Sabourin, eds. (1974). Studies in Canadian Social History. Toronto: McClelland and Stewart. ISBN 0-7710-4236-1.
- Kaufman, David, ed. (1980). A Liberation Album: Canadians in the Netherlands, 1944–45. historical text by Michiel Horn. Toronto: McGraw-Hill Ryerson. ISBN 0-07-092429-5.
- Horn, Michiel (1980). The League for Social Reconstruction: Intellectual Origins of the Democratic Left in Canada, 1930–1942. Toronto: University of Toronto Press. ISBN 0-8020-5487-0.
- Horn, Michiel (1984). The Great Depression of the 1930s in Canada. Ottawa: Canadian Historical Association. ISBN 0-88798-099-6.
- Horn, Michiel (1986). Years of Despair, 1929–1939. Toronto: Grolier. ISBN 0-7172-1861-9.
- Horn, Michiel, ed. (1988). The Depression in Canada: Responses to Economic Crisis. Toronto: Copp Clark Pitman. ISBN 0-7730-4761-1.
- Horn, Michiel (1997). Becoming Canadian: Memoirs of an Invisible Immigrant. Toronto: University of Toronto Press. ISBN 0-8020-7840-0.
- Horn, Michiel (1998). Academic Freedom in Canada: A History. Toronto: University of Toronto Press. ISBN 0-8020-0726-0.
- Horn, Michiel (2009). York University: The Way Must Be Tried. Montreal: McGill-Queen's University Press. ISBN 9780773534162. JSTOR j.ctt80266.

== See also ==
- F. R. Scott
