= Lily Laverock =

Scottish journalist, impresario and suffragist in Canada (1880–1969)

- Born: 14 June 1880; Edinburgh, Scotland
- Died: 2 December 1969 (aged 89); Duncan, British Columbia, Canada
- Education: Victoria High School (British Columbia)
- Alma mater: McGill University
- Occupations: Journalist, impresario and suffragist
- Employers: The World; Vancouver Daily News Advertiser; The Chronicle
- Organization(s): Canadian Women's Press Club, Pioneer Political Equality League

Lily Laverock (14 June 1880 – 2 December 1969) was a Scottish journalist, impresario and suffragist. She emigrated to Canada when she was ten years old.

== Biography ==
Laverock was born in 1880 in Edinburgh, Scotland. She emigrated to Canada in the 1890s.

Laverock was educated at Victoria High School in British Columbia then studied moral philosophy at McGill University in Vancouver, where she became a founding member of the University Women's Club.

In 1908, Laverock became the first woman employed as a reporter by a Vancouver newspaper, working at The World. The following year, she moved to work at the Vancouver Daily News Advertiser, and also became the first secretary and treasurer of the first Vancouver branch of the Canadian Women's Press Club. In 1910, Laverock left the News Advertiser then in 1911 she launched the first women's newspaper in British Columbia, The Chronicle. In 1918, Laverock was elected to the Vancouver's Carnegie Library management board.

Lavercock was also involved in the women's suffrage movement in Canada as a member of the Pioneer Political Equality League. She was among suffragist journalists who covered women's organisations and issues. She was part of a large deputation to the Attorney General who campaigned for better property laws for women and equal guardianship of children for mothers.

Lavercock was also an avid arts supporter. By 1921, she worked as an impresario and organised International Celebrity Concerts featuring international stars such as Geraldine Farrar, Jascha Heifetz, Fritz Kreisler, Nellie Melba, John McCormack, Benno Moiseivitsch, Sergei Rachmaninoff, Maurice Ravel, Rosa Ponselle, the Belgian Royal Symphonic Band and the Ballet Russe de Monte Carlo.

Lavercock retired in the 1950s, but continued attending concerts with her friend Helena Gutteridge. She died on 2 December 1969 in Duncan, British Columbia, Canada, and was buried there in Mountain View Cemetery.
