= Brant Pinvidic =

American film director

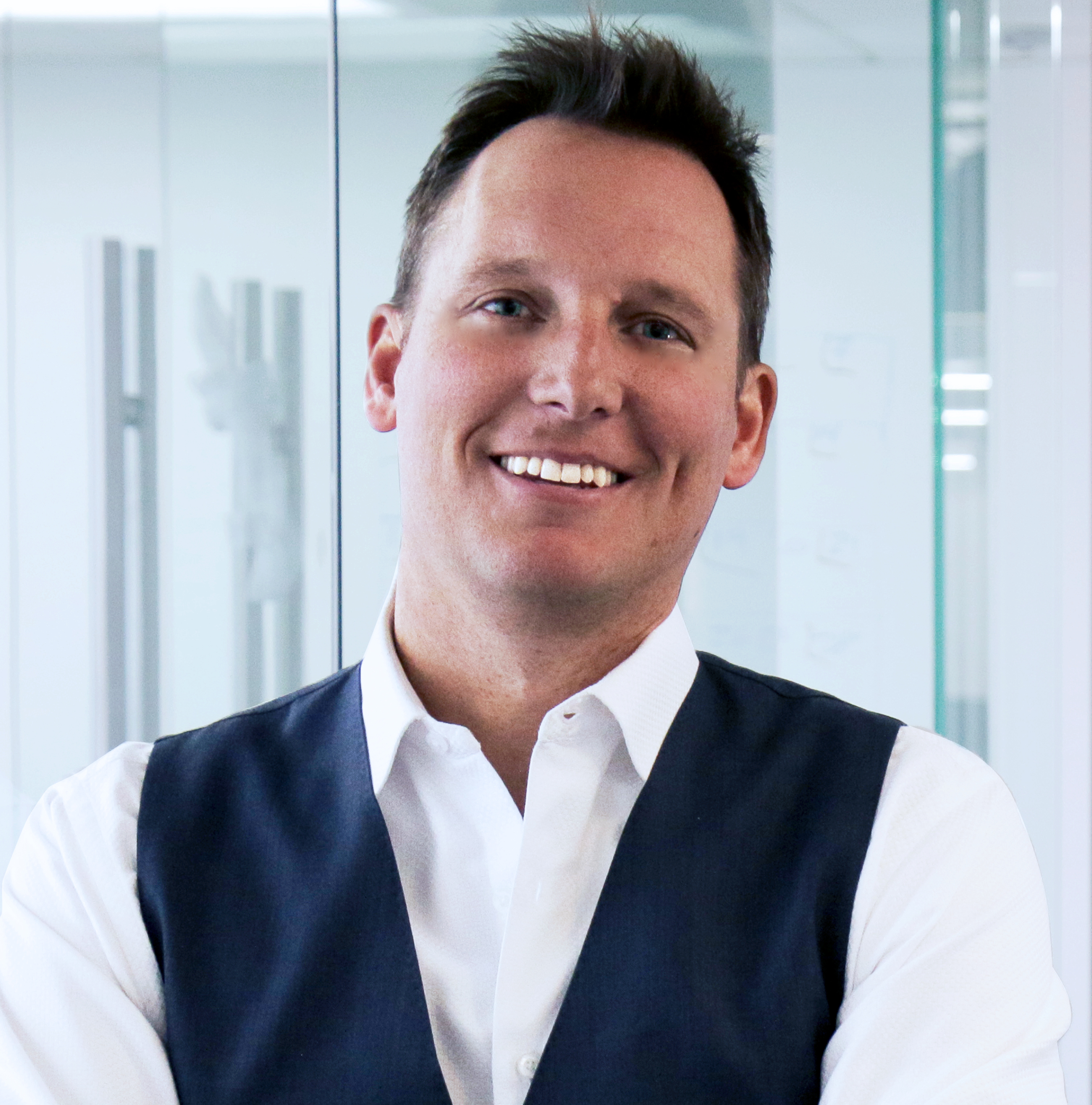
- Brant Pinvidic
- Occupations: Film producer, film director
- Years active: 2005 - present
- Organization: INvelop Entertainment
- Website: http://www.invelop.com

Brant Pinvidic is a Canadian film director known as the director of the movie Why I'm Not on Facebook (2014) and the short film Why I'm Not On Pokémon Go (2016).

== Early life and education ==
He attended Spectrum Community School in Victoria, British Columbia.

== Career ==
Pinvidic began his career producing television series and made-for-television movies in 2005. He was Senior Vice President of Development at GRB Entertainment, followed by Senior Vice President of Programming and Development for TLC, and then president and Chief Creative Officer of Eyeworks for six years. In 2016 he started INvelop Entertainment, a multimedia production company. He is one of the producers of Bar Rescue.

Pinvidic wrote, produced, and directed the film, Why I'm Not on Facebook, premiered at the Woodstock Film Festival in 2014.

In 2016, Pinvidic produced, directed, and starred in the short film Why I'm Not On Pokémon Go.

In April 2017, Pinvidic expanded the Why I'm Not... concept into an audio and video podcast, Why I'm Not... With Brant Pinvidic, in collaboration with producer Maria Menunous.

== Filmography ==
- Why I'm Not on Facebook (2015)
- Why I'm Not on Pokémon Go (2016)
