= Craigflower Elementary School =

Location
- 2766 Admirals Rd; Victoria, British Columbia, V9A 2R3; Canada
- Coordinates: 48.4538°N 123.4208°W

Information
- School type: Coeducational public elementary school
- Founded: 1854; 172 years ago
- School board: School District 61 Greater Victoria
- Superintendent: Deb Whitten
- Principal: Tim Murphy
- Grades: K–5
- Enrollment: 200
- Language: English
- Area: Gorge-Tillicum/Esquimalt
- Website: craigflower.sd61.bc.ca

Craigflower Elementary School is a public elementary school located in Victoria, British Columbia, Canada. It is the current version of the oldest schoolhouse in Western Canada, and National Historic Site, Craigflower Schoolhouse, and the third school to be called "Craigflower". The third, and current Craigflower School was constructed in the same location in 1963, and has been in use for more than half a century.

== History ==
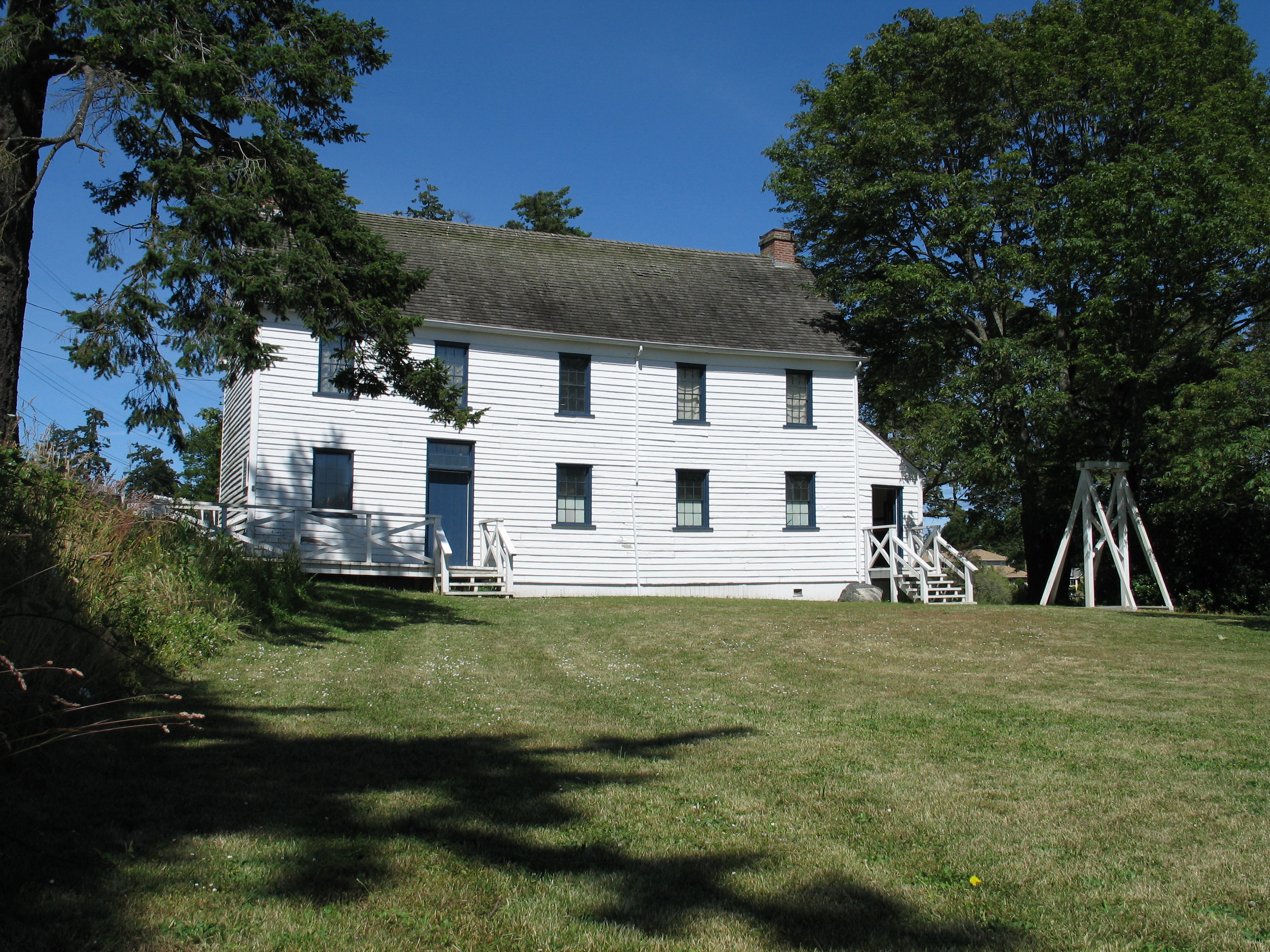
The original Craigflower Schoolhouse, viewed from the front.

Originally constructed as Maple Point School in 1854, on the order of Alexander MacKenzie, it was founded as part of Craigflower Farm, one of Western Canada's first farming communities. It provided education and boarding services to students until 1911 when it was replaced by a larger wooden schoolhouse built across the road. In 1915, the first Parent-Teacher Association in Western Canada was established at Craigflower — just prior to the first school strike in Western Canada, which took place in 1919.

The school is located within the ancestral territory of the Lekwungen, a Coast Salish tribe and ancestors of the modern Esquimalt and Songhees First Nations — both of whom have Reserves located nearby. Known as "Kosapsom" to the indigenous people, it was previously the location of a village site, and the current structure is built upon a large shell midden created by several millennia of intermittent human habitation.

== Modern Craigflower Elementary ==
Originally a K-7 school, Craigflower underwent a "significant change" in 2002, as School District 61 reconfigured its educational system to include middle schools — originally with a population of around 245, the school lost some 80 students and 6 teachers to nearby Shoreline Middle School, and became a candidate for future closure during cost-cutting measures. In addition, the school has a large First Nations population which is served by having classes teaching First Nations skills, and a split kindergarten class year.

In 2000, the school was honored by the Provincial Government for an innovative program called "Successmaker", which used computer software to help educators bring struggling students up to their normal skill levels in a number of fundamental areas such as reading and mathematics — with an average improvement worth 8 months of classwork. The program, run by Gen Gleason, First Nations skills teacher, was featured in the "Bright Lights: stories of success and excellence from B.C. elementary schools" booklet which was distributed to all elementary schools in the province.

However, many students still struggle to achieve academic success — district graduation rates for First Nations students remain low, relative to others. Craigflower takes part in many activities designed to help their First Nations students, such as backpack and school supply give-aways funded by non-profit and government sources. Nonetheless, Craigflower's close proximity to its historic predecessor provides many opportunities for teaching students about local and provincial history. In 2003, the Royal B.C. Museum hosted a collection of work created by students, including those from Craigflower, which explained the history of the local sport of lacrosse. In 1999, students took part in dramatic recreations at the old schoolhouse, aimed to entertain and educate children about colonial times.

The school is also active in athletics, with a gymnasium and active soccer team. In 1999, the school took part in "an innovative and interactive cross-country bicycle tour", as one of the 80 host schools chosen from across Canada to greet a national team of riders as they visited every province and territory by bike as part of the Canadian Heritage Interactive Journey.
