= School District 61 Greater Victoria =

School district in British Columbia, Canada

Location
- 556 Boleskine Road, Victoria BC Canada V8Z 1E8 Greater Victoria on Vancouver Island Canada

District information
- Superintendent: Deb Whitten
- Schools: 56
- Budget: CA$134.3 million

Students and staff
- Students: 20,024

Other information
- Website: www.sd61.bc.ca

School District 61 Greater Victoria is a school district in the Canadian province of British Columbia. This includes Victoria, the municipalities of Esquimalt, Oak Bay, View Royal, and parts of Saanich.

== History ==
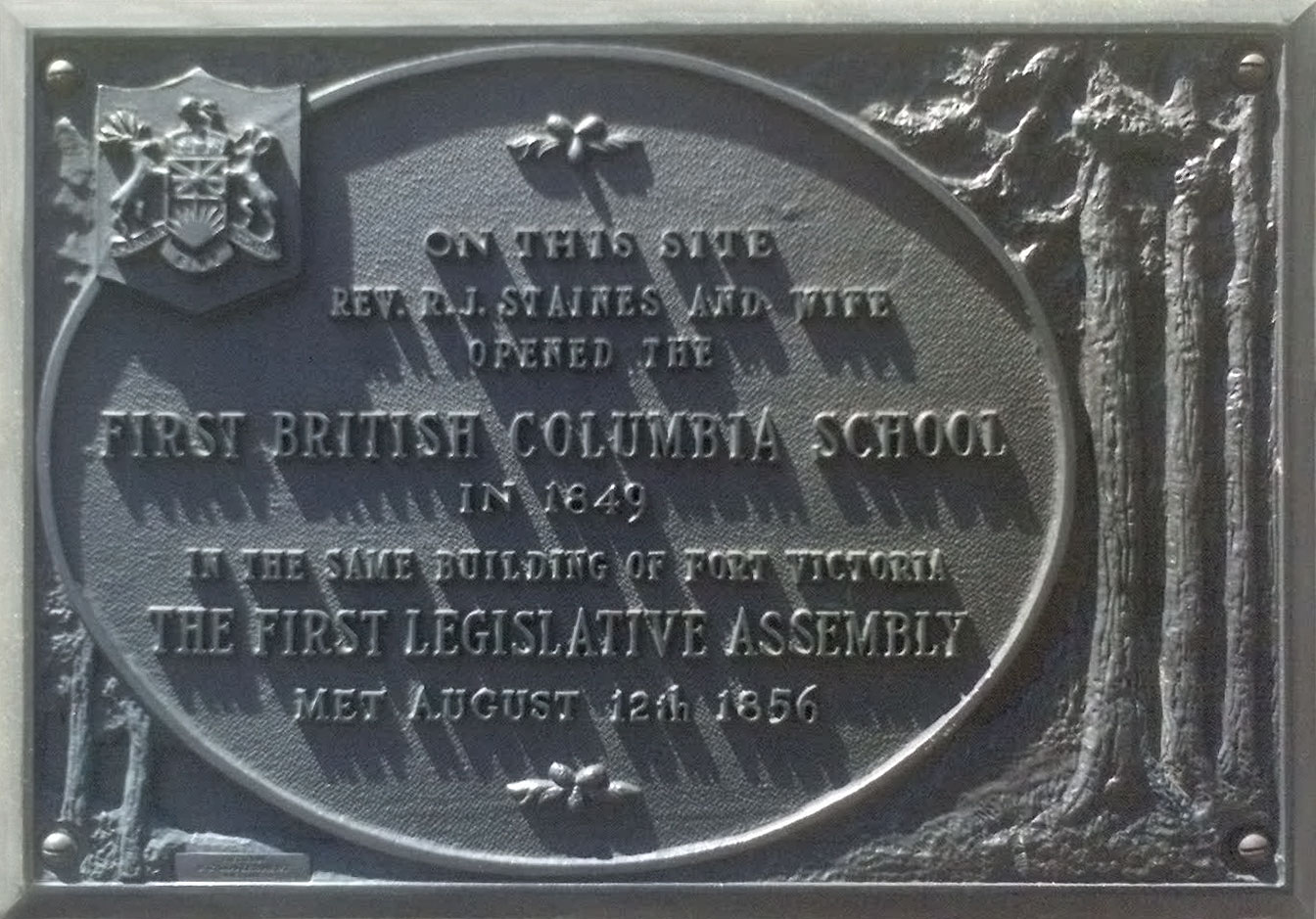
Plaque commemorating first BC school

The earliest history of schools in Western Canada is within the boundary of the current Greater Victoria School district. The first school in the area that is present day British Columbia was established at Fort Victoria in the 1840s. A plaque to commemorate this can be found on the side of the Christmas Store on Government and Fort Street in downtown Victoria.

The first public school was opened in 1853 near what is now Central Middle School. This building later became Victoria High School.

When the area became part of the province of British Columbia there were already three school districts in the area: the Victoria City School District (established on June 25, 1869), the Esquimalt School District (October 22, 1870) and Craigflower School District (July 23, 1870).

== Schools ==
| School | Location | Grades |
|---|---|---|
| Arbutus Global Middle School | Saanich | 6-8 |
| Braefoot Elementary School | Saanich | K-5 |
| Burnside Community School | Victoria | K-5 |
| Campus View Elementary School | Saanich | K-5 |
| Central Middle School | Victoria | 6-8 |
| Cloverdale Elementary School | Saanich | K-5 |
| Colquitz Middle School | Saanich | 6-8 |
| Continuing Ed SD 61 | Victoria | 12 |
| Craigflower Elementary School | Saanich | K-5 |
| Doncaster Elementary School | Saanich | K-5 |
| Eagle View Elementary School | View Royal | K-5 |
| Ecole Intermediare Cedar Hill Middle School | Saanich | 6-8 |
| Esquimalt High School | Esquimalt | 9-12 |
| Frank Hobbs Elementary School | Saanich | K-5 |
| George Jay Elementary School | Victoria | K-5 |
| Glanford Middle School | Saanich | 6-8 |
| Gordon Head Middle School | Saanich | 6-8 |
| Hillcrest Elementary School | Saanich | K-5 |
| Home Learners' Link SD61 | Victoria | K-12 |
| James Bay Community School | Victoria | K-5 |
| Lake Hill Elementary School | Saanich | K-5 |
| Lambrick Park Secondary School | Saanich | 9-12 |
| Lansdowne Middle School | Saanich | 6-8 |
| Ledger House School Program | Victoria | |
| Macaulay Elementary School | Esquimalt | K-5 |
| Margaret Jenkins Elementary School | Victoria | K-5 |
| Marigold Elementary School | Saanich | K-5 |
| Mckenzie Elementary School | Saanich | K-5 |
| Monterey Middle School | Oak Bay | 6-8 |
| Mount Douglas Secondary School | Saanich | 9-12 |
| Northridge Elementary School | Saanich | K-5 |
| Oak Bay High School | Oak Bay | 9-12 |
| Oaklands Elementary School | Victoria | K-5 |
| Quadra Elementary School | Victoria | K-5 |
| Reynolds Secondary School | Saanich | 9-12 |
| Rockheights Middle School | Esquimalt | 6-8 |
| Rogers Elementary School | Saanich | K-5 |
| S J Willis Educational Centre | Victoria | 9-11 |
| Shoreline Community Middle School | View Royal | 6-8 |
| Sir James Douglas Elementary School | Victoria | K-5 |
| South Park Family school | Victoria | K-5 |
| Spectrum Community School | Saanich | 9-12 |
| Strawberry Vale Elementary School | Saanich | K-5 |
| Sundance Elementary School | Victoria | K-5 |
| Tillicum Elementary School | Saanich | K-5 |
| Torquay Elementary School | Saanich | K-5 |
| Uplands Campus (international) | Oak Bay | 8-12 |
| Victor School | Victoria | 1-12 |
| Victoria High School | Victoria | 9-12 |
| Victoria SD Hospital Program | Victoria | |
| Victoria West Elementary School | Victoria | K-5 |
| View Royal Elementary School | View Royal | K-5 |
| Willows Elementary School | Oak Bay | K-5 |

== See also ==
- List of school districts in British Columbia
