= Craigdarroch Castle =

Historic house museum in British Columbia, Canada

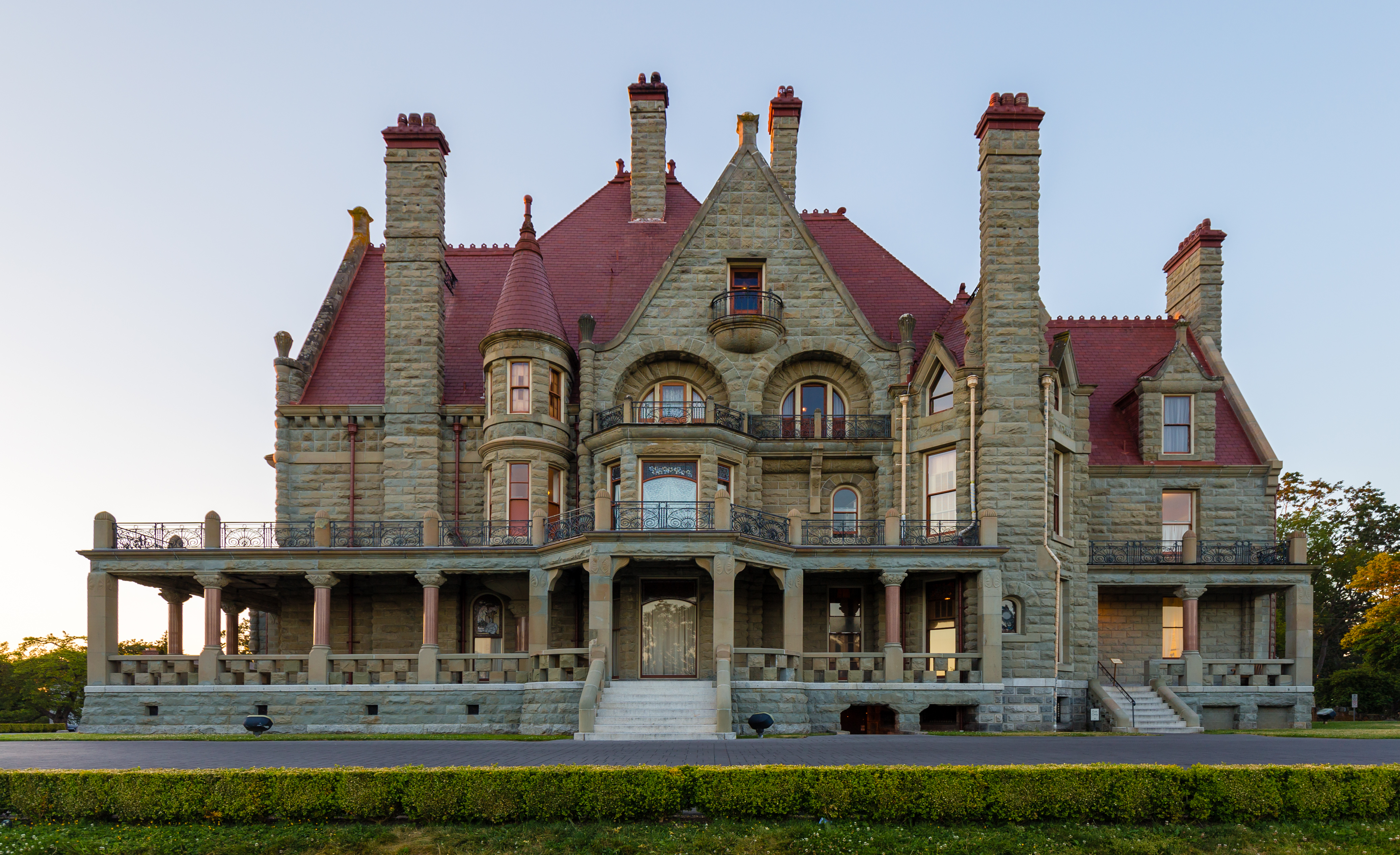
- Viewed from the south

- Location in British Columbia
- Established: 1890 (construction), 1979 (museum)
- Location: 1050 Joan Crescent; Victoria, British Columbia; V8S 3L5
- Coordinates: 48°25′21.5″N 123°20′37.5″W
- Type: Historic house museum (Victorian era/Victorian architecture)
- Visitors: 150,000 per year
- Public transit access: Victoria Regional Transit System #11 and #14 bus
- Website: www.thecastle.ca

National Historic Site of Canada
- Official name: Craigdarroch National Historic Site of Canada
- Designated: 1992

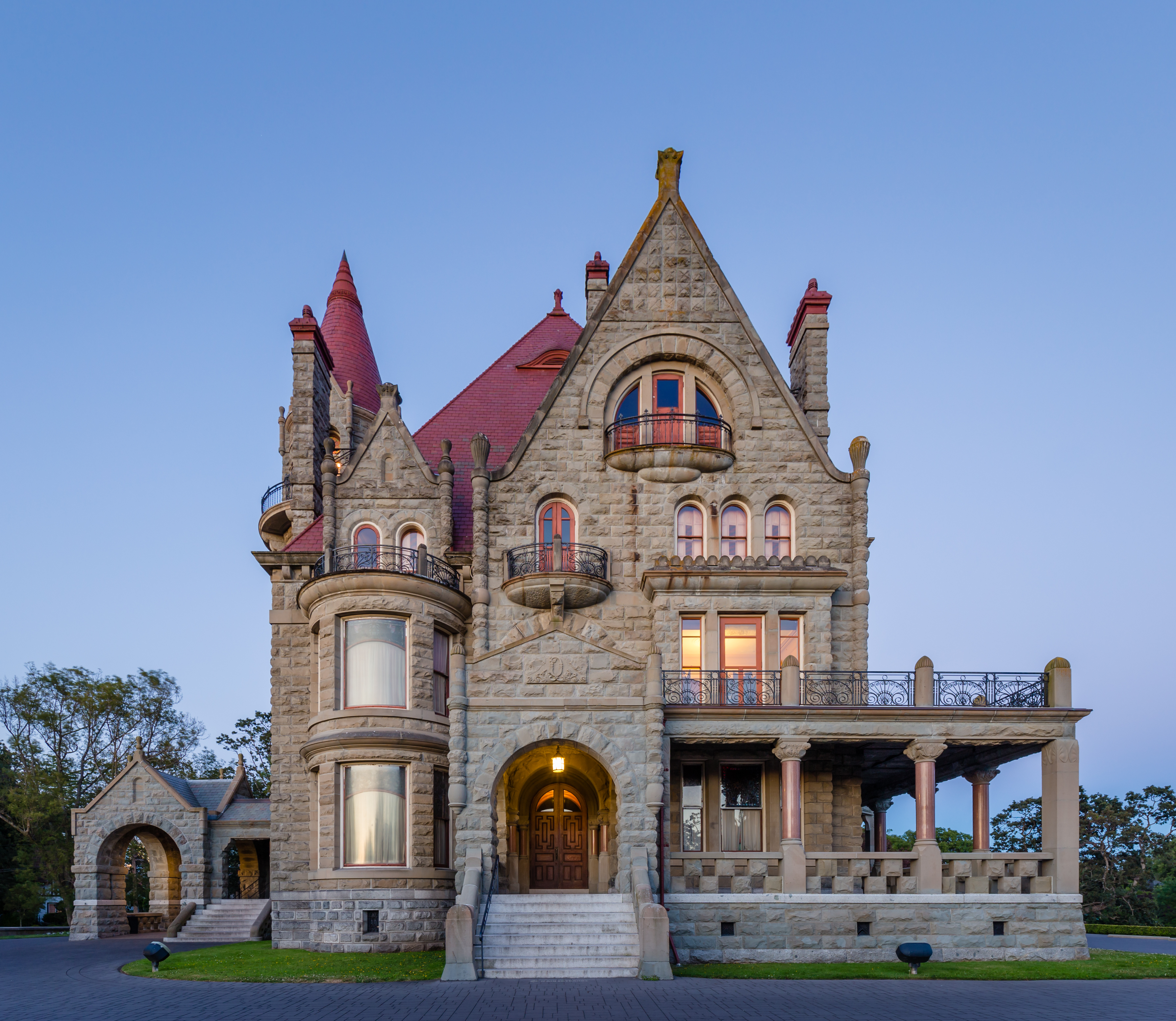
Viewed from the west

Craigdarroch Castle in Victoria, British Columbia, Canada, is a historic, Victorian-era Scottish baronial mansion. It was designated a National Historic Site of Canada due to its landmark status in Victoria.

== History ==
It was constructed in the late 19th century as a family residence for the wealthy coal baron Robert Dunsmuir and his wife Joan. Robert died on 12 April 1889, 17 months before construction on the castle was completed. His sons Alexander and James took over the role of finishing the home after his death. James also commissioned the construction of Victoria's second "castle": Hatley Castle located in Colwood, British Columbia.

Upon the death of Robert Dunsmuir's widow, Joan, the Craigdarroch estate was sold to land speculator Griffith Hughes for $38,000 who subdivided the estate into building lots. To stimulate sales during a slow real estate market, Griffiths announced that the home would be the subject of a raffle, to be won by one of the purchasers of the residential parcels carved from the estate. The winner, Solomon Cameron, mortgaged the home to finance other speculative ventures which failed, leaving him broke, and in 1919 ownership of the home passed to one of Cameron's creditors, the Bank of Montreal.

The building later served as a military hospital, college, offices, and a conservatory, before it was re-purposed as a historical museum in 1979. The museum is currently owned by the Craigdarroch Castle Historical Museum Society, which is a private non-profit society, and is open to the public. The building is a tourist attraction, and receives 150,000 visitors a year.

The building was designated as a National Historic Site of Canada in 1992.

Since its completion in 1890, the building had six major occupants, including:

- The Dunsmuirs (1890–1908)
- Military Hospital (1919–1921)
- Victoria College (1921–1946)
- Victoria School Board Office (1946–1968)
- Victoria Conservatory of Music (1969–1979)
- Craigdarroch Castle museum (1979–Present)

== Architecture ==
Craigdarroch Castle is a historic Châteauesque mansion in Victoria, British Columbia, identified as a bonanza castle, a term used for large residences built during North America's industrial expansion by individuals who accumulated significant wealth. Constructed between 1887 and 1890, its total cost is uncertain, with estimates ranging from $185,000 to $500,000, including land and grounds. The building spans approximately 25,000 square feet and contains 37 rooms, 17 fireplaces, and a tower accessible by 87 steps.

Craigdarroch Castle was originally situated on a 28-acre estate. The name "Craigdarroch," derived from Gaelic, translates to "rocky, oak place," a reference to the surrounding Garry Oak meadow ecosystem in Victoria’s Rockland neighbourhood. The current property encompasses approximately 1.75 acres, including a south lawn.

Designed by Warren Heywood Williams and Arthur Lorenzo Smith of Portland, Oregon, the castle’s original architectural plans have not been preserved, and only one known interior photograph exists from the period when the Dunsmuir family resided there. The interior features extensive wood paneling and parquet flooring, supplied by the A.H. Andrews Company of Chicago.

Prefabricated components, including stairs, doors, window frames, and 2,128 panels, were manufactured in Chicago and transported to Victoria. Window shutters were provided by the Willer Blind Company of Milwaukee.

Various types of wood were used in the interior, including white oak for the main hall and staircase, Spanish mahogany in the library, western red cedar in the porte-cochère and back hall, cherry in the breakfast room and window sashes, Hawaiian koa in the drawing room floor, and American ash for the back stairs. The parquet flooring includes a mix of woods such as ebony, rosewood, walnut, maple, holly, and teak.

Craigdarroch Castle contains a collection of original Victorian stained and leaded glass windows, attributed to the Pacific Art Glass Works of San Francisco. The building also features an encaustic tile floor by Minton, Hollins & Co. imported from England, with decorative patterns characteristic of Victorian-era design. These elements contribute to the historical and architectural significance of the site.

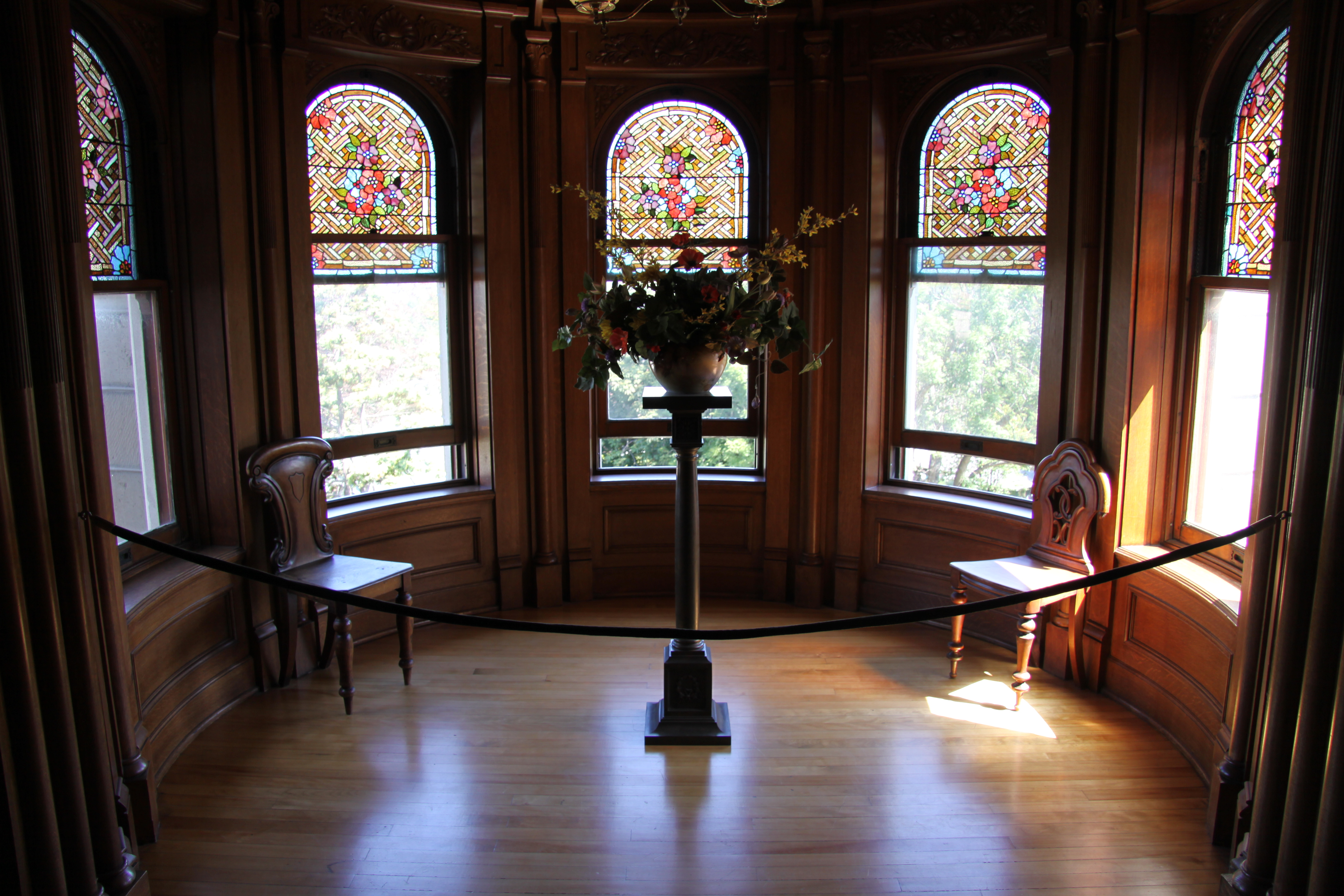
Stained windows in Craigdarroch Castle, a noted feature of the building

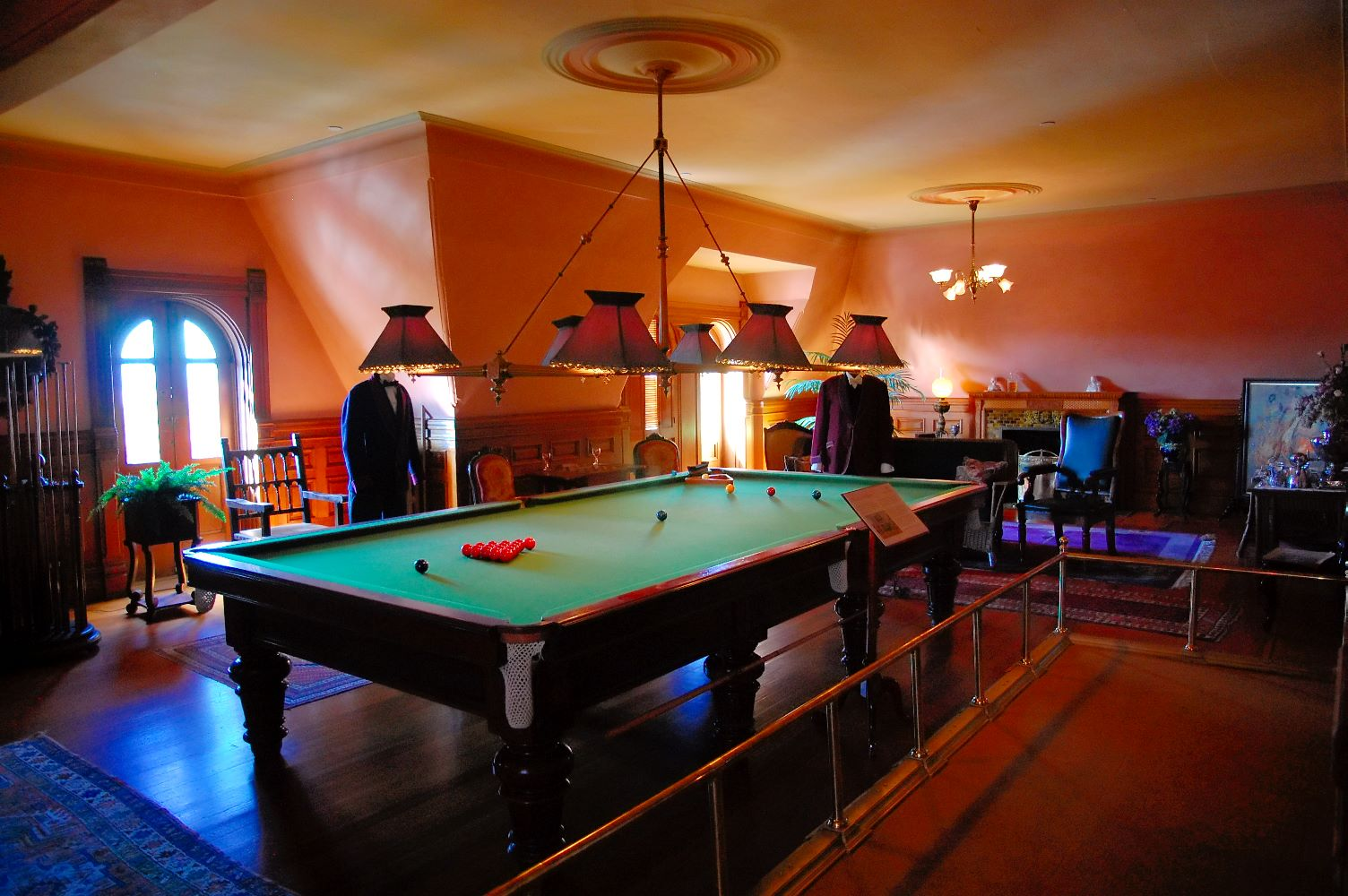
A period exhibit in Craigdarroch's billiards room. The home has served as a historical museum since 1979.

== Artwork ==
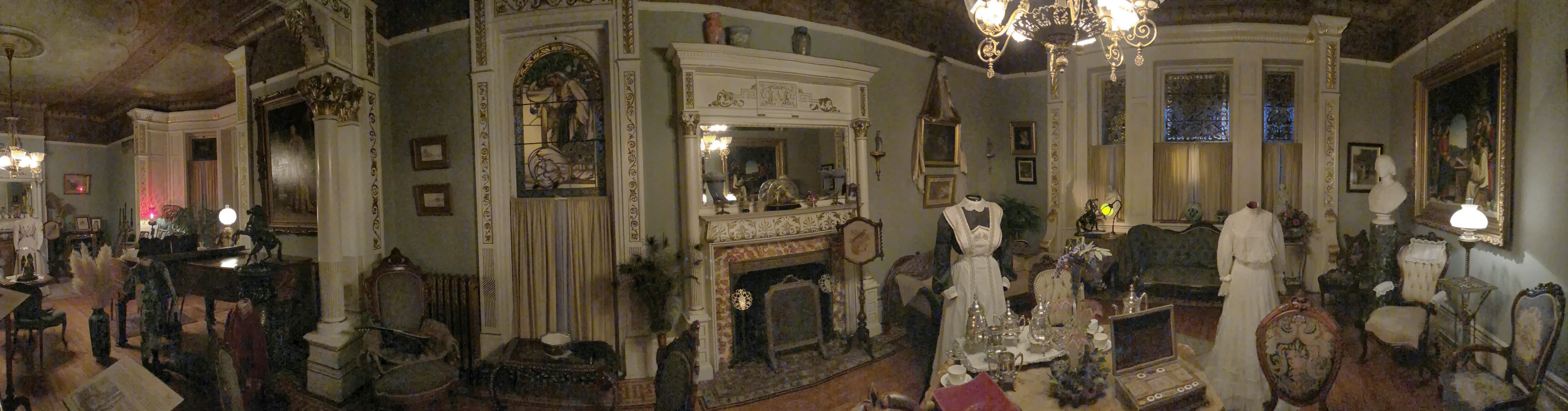
Drawing Room, Craigdarroch Castle

The Drawing Room at Craigdarroch Castle functioned as a formal reception area for guests and may have also been used for smaller family gatherings. The term "drawing room" historically referred to a space where individuals would withdraw after dinner, with women typically retiring to the room before being joined later by men. In some contexts, drawing rooms were also referred to as parlors.

A stained-glass window in the room, known as the "woman with a swan" window, is a replica of the original, which was based on the 1862 English oil painting Odalisque by Sir Frederic Leighton. The original window was damaged in 1927.

The ceiling of the Drawing Room originally featured hand-painted decoration, which was covered with white paint in 1935 when the castle was repurposed as Victoria College. Between 1995 and 2007, restoration efforts removed five layers of paint, revealing the original stenciled and hand-painted designs. The restoration process included sealing the artwork with a clear artist's varnish and performing touch-up work as necessary. This ceiling is believed to be the only one in the castle with decorative painting.

A small section of the original stencil below the picture rail remains visible in the southeast corner of the room. This remnant was used to create a template for reproducing the stencil pattern across the room. The original trim colour was likely a creamier shade, with gold leaf accents applied to the edges of the acanthus designs.

The floor of the Drawing Room is made of Hawaiian koa wood, a material also used in the construction of musical instruments such as guitars and ukuleles.

Over the years, the room has served multiple purposes, including as a recreation space for patients during the castle’s use as a hospital, a classroom during its time as Victoria College, and an office when the building was used by the School Board.

== Books ==
- Craigdarroch Castle in 21 Treasures, by Moira Dann (2021), 144-page paperback book published by TouchWood Editions. ISBN 9781771513487

== See also ==
- List of historic places in Victoria, British Columbia
