= Spectrum Community School (British Columbia) =

Location
- 957 Burnside Road West; Saanich, British Columbia, V8Z 6E1; Canada; 48.461965°N 123.407628°W

Information
- School type: Public, high school
- Founded: 1974
- School board: School District 61 Greater Victoria
- Principal: Aaron Norris
- Grades: 9-12
- Enrollment: 1170 (2017-2018)
- Language: English,
- Campus: Suburban
- Colours: Orange, White & Black
- Mascot: The warm fuzzy
- Team name: Thunder
- Website: spectrum.sd61.bc.ca

Spectrum Community School is a high school in the Greater Victoria suburb of Saanich, British Columbia, Canada. It is part of the Greater Victoria School District and serves the western portion of the district. Spectrum was established in 1974 as a replacement for Mount View High School and the school moved into the new facility in 1976. In 2005 a $5.5 million addition and renovation was completed. There are four computer labs and an active interactive whiteboard resources program. The school has an Aboriginal Nations Education program and accepts international students from the Victoria International High School program. The school's auditorium is a venue for the Greater Victoria Performing Arts festival. In 2006 students voted to select a team name and the nickname "Thunder" was chosen.

== Programs ==
Academic

- Health Science
- Secondary School Apprenticeship
- Infotech
- AVID (Advancement Via Individual Determination)
- Honours classes

Career

- Culinary Arts/Cook Training
- Electrical
- Law Careers
- Outdoor Leadership

Performing Arts

- Junior Concert Band
- Senior Concert Band
- Junior Jazz Band
- Senior Jazz Band
- Concert Choir
- Guitar Lab
- Junior Musical Theatre
- Mainstage Musical Theatre Production
- Dance Performance, Choreography, and Advanced Dance
- Stagecraft & Technical Theatre
- Video Arts & Media Arts

Athletics
There are 19 athletic teams, including:

- Hockey Skills Academy
- Football
- Basketball

In 2024, the Spectrum Thunder Senior Boys Basketball Team won the BC Boys Basketball Quad A provincial championships as the second-seeded team in the tournament after defeating the fourth-seeded Tamanawis Wildcats in the provincial final 92-72.

== Notable alumni ==
- Dan Bennett, rapper
- Shawn Farquhar, magician
- Eddie Murray, retired NFL kicker
- Brant Pinvidic, Canadian-American reality television producer and director
