= Esquimalt High School =

Location
- 847 Colville Rd. Victoria, British Columbia, V9A 4N9; Canada; 48.438°N 123.397°W

Information
- School type: Public, high school
- Motto: Esse Quam Videri (To Be, Rather Than To Seem)
- Established: 24 August 1915
- School board: School District 61 Greater Victoria
- Superintendent: Shelley Green
- Principal: Sarah Garr
- Vice Principals: Chris Koutougos, Sonja van der Putten
- Faculty: 72
- Grades: 9-12
- Enrollment: 628 (2016-2017)
- Language: English, French
- Campus: Urban
- Colour
- Website: www.esquimalt.sd61.bc.ca

École Secondaire Esquimalt High School (or "EHS") is a high school located in Esquimalt, a township located west of Victoria, British Columbia, Canada. EHS is operated by the Greater Victoria School District. It is the designated secondary school for Shoreline and Rockheights Middle Schools and serves students from Esquimalt, View Royal, and the Victoria neighbourhoods of Vic West and Craigflower. The school is one of three to retain "High School" in its name when the Province of B.C. directed the change to "Secondary School". The school is served by the student-run newspaper Esquimalt Ink.

== Academic programs ==
In addition to standard core curriculum programs, the following are offered:

- Career Preparation Programs in Jazz, Media & Graphic Arts, Automotive Technology and Food Industry Training
- Culinary Arts
- 4C Challenge Gifted Education (commitment to tasks; creative problem solving; challenging curriculum and assignments; and community involvement)
- Dramatic Arts
- Fine Arts
  - Jr. Concert Band
  - Sr. Concert Band
  - Jr. Jazz Ensemble
  - Sr. Jazz Ensemble
  - Concert Choir
  - Vocal Ensemble
  - Rhythm and Blues Band
- First Nations Education
- French Immersion
- Leadership
- Musical Theatre
- Improv
- Technology Education (woodworking, metalworking, electronics, automotive technology)
- Victoria International High School Programs

== Athletics ==
The various athletics teams are known as the Esquimalt Dockers.

- Basketball
- Curling
- Rowing
- Rugby
- Swimming
- Wrestling
- Badminton
- Tennis

The Curling Academy focuses on developing a blend of skills including academic excellence, leadership development, and curling skills. The program accepts students from all levels of curling proficiency, including wheelchair curlers.

== Weather Station ==
The University of Victoria operates a weather station at EHS as part of its School-Based Weather Station Network which gathers data from schools around Greater Victoria for its Climate Modelling Group of the School of Earth and Ocean Science. The data is collected at the university and used to provide meteorological forecasts online.

== Sustainability ==
The school is a participant in the Sustainable High Schools Project offered by the Sierra Club BC’s Environmental Education Program.

== Notable alumni ==
- Luke Burton-Krahn, CFL player
- Meg Tilly, actress, Broadway stage dancer, writer, and Academy Award nominee (attended in Grade 12, graduated Chief Sealth High School)
- Jennifer Tilly, actress
