= View Royal =

Town in British Columbia, Canada

- Town
- Town of View Royal
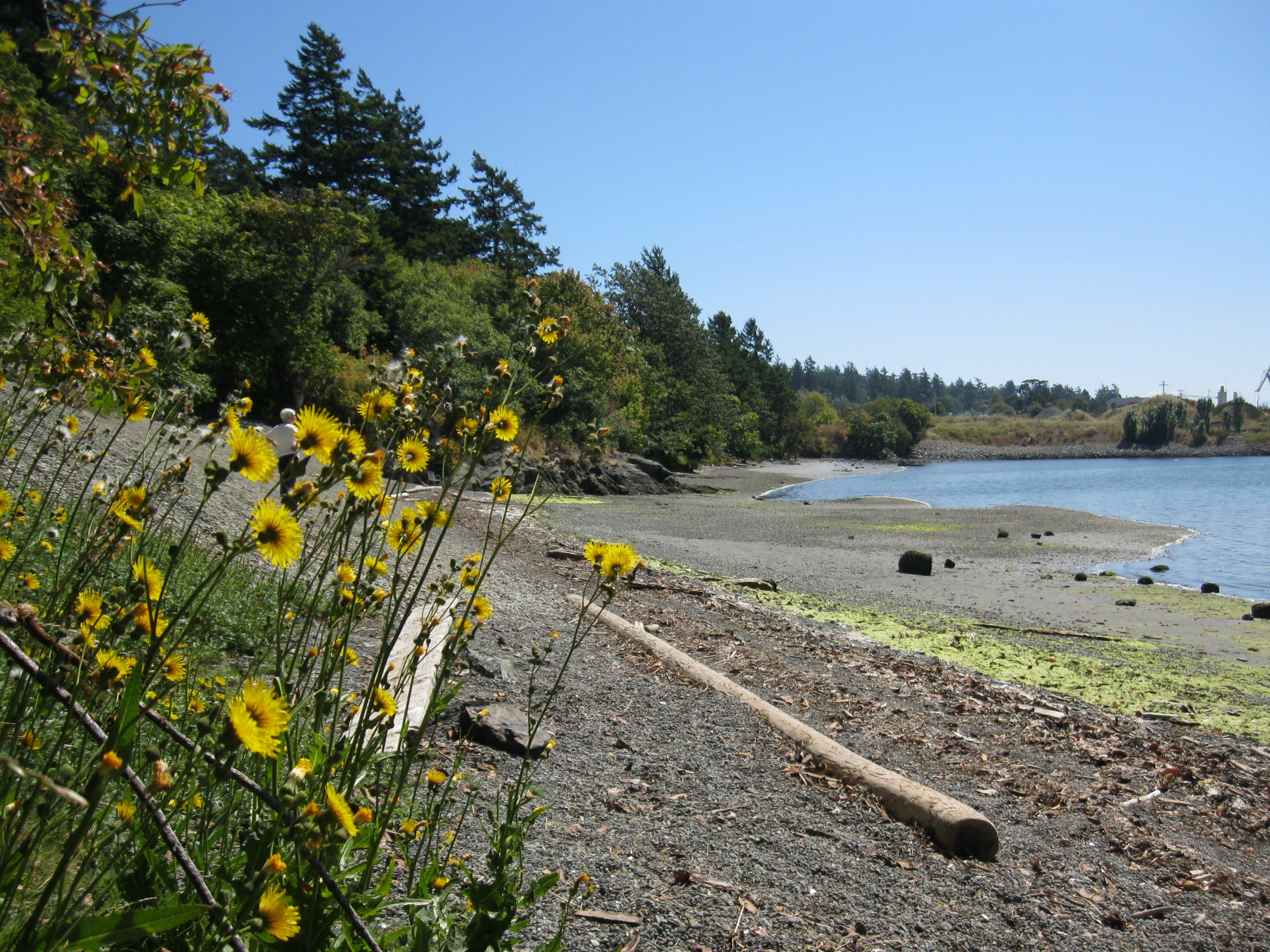
- Portage Park on Thetis Cove

- Location of View Royal within the Capital Regional District

- Location of View Royal within British Columbia View Royal (British Columbia)
- Coordinates: 48°27′19″N 123°26′19″W
- Country: Canada
- Province: British Columbia
- Regional district: Capital
- Incorporated: 1988

Government
  - Type: Municipal
  - Governing body: View Royal Town Council
  - Mayor: Volker Dammann
  - MP: Stephanie McLean (Liberal)
  - MLA: Darlene Rotchford (NDP)

Area
  - Land: 14.33 km^{2} (5.53 sq mi)
- Elevation: 20 m (66 ft)

Population (2021)
  - Total: 11,575
  - Density: 807.6/km^{2} (2,092/sq mi)
- Time zone: UTC−07:00 (PT)
- Postal code: V9B
- Area code: 250
- Highways: Highway 1 (TCH)
- Website: www.viewroyal.ca

View Royal is a town in Greater Victoria and a member municipality of the Capital Regional District of British Columbia, Canada. View Royal has a population of 11,575 residents. With over 700 hectares (1,700 acres) of parkland, View Royal includes Thetis, McKenzie, Pike, and Prior Lakes and portions of Esquimalt Harbour and Portage Inlet.

== History ==
European settlement began in the 1850s by Kenneth Mackenzie who established a farm known as Craigflower Manor. In the mid-19th century, Dr. John Helmcken, Vancouver Island's first doctor and later speaker of the British Columbia Legislative Assembly, paid the Hudson's Bay Company $5 per acre for hundreds of acres of land between Esquimalt Harbour and what is now Victoria General Hospital. The land was cleared for Victoria's growth. In 1912, the Island Investment Company bought 80 acres (32 ha) of land below Four Mile Hill, fronting the harbour, from Dr. Helmcken’s son James. They marketed lots as "View Royal" because of their "royal view", which gave the town its name.

View Royal remained unorganized for over half a century. By the 1950s, things had begun to change. In 1959, a group of residents in the Shoreline Drive area circulated a petition urging annexation by Esquimalt. Several studies and referendums came and went, but View Royal continued with its unorganized status. In 1966, the Capital Regional District emerged, bringing with it regional approaches for such service deliveries as sewage collection. Then a Price Waterhouse study presented three options: status quo, union with Esquimalt, or incorporation as a town. The town’s incorporation became official on December 5, 1988.

Many historic sites still exist in View Royal, including:

- Four Mile Pub & Six Mile Pub: two historic "road houses" or pubs that have existed for approximately 150 years.
- Craigflower Manor & Schoolhouse: one of Canada's National Historic Sites. Completed in 1856, the Manor site was one of four original farms set up by the Hudson's Bay Company as part of their obligations in settling Vancouver Island. The site housed the McKenzie family in the Manor as well as twenty other dwellings, a sawmill, a flour mill, a blacksmith's shop, a brick kiln, a slaughterhouse, and a general store. The Craigflower Schoolhouse, the companion adjacent site to the Manor, is located across a municipal border. The two properties are located at the intersection of Admirals Road, Craigflower Road, and Island Highway.

Several changes have gone on in View Royal in recent years, including the completion of the Island Highway Improvement Project in 2011, which included new cycle lanes, sidewalks, turning lanes, and planted medians. Beginning in 2013, the Town of View Royal and District of Saanich replaced the 80-year-old Craigflower Bridge and approach roads, and construction began on the new Public Safety Building, completed in fall 2014.

== Geography ==
View Royal is divided into eight neighbourhoods based on topography, transportation corridors, natural environment, and the age of housing stock. These neighbourhoods are Atkins, Burnside, Craigflower, Harbour, Helmcken, Hospital, Thetis, and Wilfert.

View Royal has 70 municipal parks and 25 kilometres (16 mi) of trails. View Royal's shoreline includes sandy beaches with small caves, large driftwood, and rocks, which are home to starfish, crabs, seals, and other marine life.

== Demographics ==
In the 2021 Census of Population conducted by Statistics Canada, View Royal had a population of 11,575 living in 4,915 of its 5,175 total private dwellings, a change of 11.2% from its 2016 population of 10,408. With a land area of 14.33 km^{2} (5.53 sq mi), it had a population density of 807.7/km^{2} (2,092.1/sq mi) in 2021.

In 2011, there were almost 4,140 housing units in the town with a median population age of 44.1 years, which compares to the CRD at 44.8.

Historical census populations – View Royal

Year	Pop.	±%
1986	4,963	—
1991	5,925	+19.4%
1996	6,441	+8.7%
2001	7,271	+12.9%

Year	Pop.	±%
2006	8,768	+20.6%
2011	9,381	+7.0%
2016	10,408	+10.9%
2021	11,575	+11.2%

Source: Statistics Canada

=== Ethnicity ===
Panethnic groups in the Town of View Royal (2001−2021)
Panethnic group	2021		2016		2011		2006		2001	
Panethnic group	Pop.	%	Pop.	%	Pop.	%	Pop.	%	Pop.	%
European (Note: Statistic includes all persons that did not make up part of a visible minority or an indigenous identity.)	8,610	76.47%	8,045	81.18%	8,085	87.45%	7,710	88.88%	6,490	89.39%
Indigenous	670	5.95%	435	4.39%	250	2.7%	160	1.84%	180	2.48%
South Asian	655	5.82%	565	5.7%	415	4.49%	215	2.48%	190	2.62%
East Asian (Note: Statistic includes total responses of "Chinese", "Korean", and "Japanese" under visible minority section on census.)	615	5.46%	350	3.53%	210	2.27%	250	2.88%	190	2.62%
Southeast Asian (Note: Statistic includes total responses of "Filipino" and "Southeast Asian" under visible minority section on census.)	270	2.4%	200	2.02%	170	1.84%	65	0.75%	85	1.17%
African	205	1.82%	135	1.36%	20	0.22%	130	1.5%	60	0.83%
Middle Eastern (Note: Statistic includes total responses of "West Asian" and "Arab" under visible minority section on census.)	105	0.93%	45	0.45%	15	0.16%	30	0.35%	0	0%
Latin American	100	0.89%	90	0.91%	45	0.49%	110	1.27%	25	0.34%
Other/multiracial (Note: Statistic includes total responses of "Visible minority, n.i.e." and "Multiple visible minorities" under visible minority section on census.)	30	0.27%	35	0.35%	0	0%	10	0.12%	45	0.62%
Total responses	11,260	97.28%	9,910	95.22%	9,245	98.55%	8,675	98.94%	7,260	99.85%
Total population	11,575	100%	10,408	100%	9,381	100%	8,768	100%	7,271	100%
Note: Totals greater than 100% due to multiple origin responses.

=== Religion ===
According to the 2021 census, religious groups in View Royal included:

- Irreligion (6,535 persons or 58.0%)
- Christianity (3,890 persons or 34.5%)
- Islam (195 persons or 1.7%)
- Hinduism (185 persons or 1.6%)
- Sikhism (170 persons or 1.5%)
- Buddhism (90 persons or 0.8%)
- Judaism (40 persons or 0.4%)
- Other (165 persons or 1.5%)
