= Haro Woods =

Haro Woods is one of the few urban forests remaining in the Municipality of Saanich, one of the 13 municipalities which make up the Capital Regional District (CRD) on the south portion of Vancouver Island (CRD includes and 3 electoral areas, also). It is similar in beauty to Mystic Vale, the forested ravine located to the south east and outside of the University of Victoria (UVIC) campus. Mystic Vale is on the list of protected areas of British Columbia.

== Geography and Location ==
The total area of Haro Woods is about 9 hectares (approx. 22.25 acres). The woods are made up of four parcels, of which the District of Saanich owns two at a total of 5.75 ha (14.2 ac).

A third parcel (1.56 ha/3.9 ac) is owned by the Capital Regional District (CRD). The final parcel (1.46 ha/3.6 ac) is owned by the University of Victoria.

== Controversy ==
CRD purchased the northwest half of the Woods from the Queen Alexandra Foundation for Children's Health so that it would possibly be available to use for sewage treatment by the region. The QA Foundation leases some of their land to VIHA to provide medical services to children at the Queen Alexandra Centre for Children's Health.

Concerned citizens realize Haro Woods might face a new threat, that of the destruction of its central core, in order to build one of CRD's secondary sewage treatment plants. The construction of such a plant in this area runs against urban planning as most settlements and cities show forethought and conscious design in their layout and functioning.

Haro Woods is of historical significance as a public wild woodland in the Queenswood neighbourhood with many citizens and members of the Cadboro Bay Residents Association working to remove invasive species (blackberry, broom etc.) from one of its sections. In the spring of 2008 in a three-week period, thousands of signatures were gathered in a petition to save the area from inappropriate development.

UVIC has already committed in their Campus Plan to retain their part of Haro Woods as protected greenspace "in perpetuity".

It now appears, in 2011, that sewage treatment will be developed at other sites in the Greater Victoria region.
