= Stephen Arthur Jennings =

Canadian mathematician (1915–1979)

Stephen Arthur Jennings (May 11, 1915 – February 2, 1979) was a mathematician who made contributions to the study of modular representation theory (Jennings 1941). His advisor was Richard Brauer, and his student Rimhak Ree discovered two infinite series of finite simple groups known as the Ree groups. Jennings was an editor of Mathematics Magazine and an acting president of the University of Victoria.

== Biography ==
Jennings was born in Walthamstow, England, and immigrated to Canada with his family in 1928. He had been receiving scholarships in England and these were transferred to Canada. He finished his high school education in Toronto and in September 1932 he went to University College in Toronto. In 1939 he received his PHD from the University of Toronto. He married Dorothy Freeda Rintoul in 1939. On November 14, 1942, he became a Member of the Zeta Psi fraternity. When he was made a professor, he was the youngest professor ever appointed in Canada. In 1944 Stephen was appointed 2nd Lieutenant (Paymaster) in Canadian Army. While in Vancouver, teaching at the University of British Columbia, Stephen and Dorothy had two children, Judith and James. Jennings was Dean of Graduate Studies at the University of Victoria and the Head of the Mathematics Department there.

== Selected bibliography ==
- An Introduction to Calculus. S.A. Jennings. Department of Education, Victoria, B.C. 1966
- Chang, Bomshik; Jennings, S. A.; Ree, Rimhak (1958), "On certain pairs of matrices which generate free groups", Canadian Journal of Mathematics, 10: 279–284, doi:10.4153/CJM-1958-029-2, ISSN 0008-414X, MR 0094388
- Jennings, S. A.; Ree, Rimhak (1957), "On a family of Lie algebras of characteristic p", Transactions of the American Mathematical Society, 84 (1), American Mathematical Society: 192–207, doi:10.2307/1992897, JSTOR 1992897, MR 0082633
- Jennings, S. A. (1955), "Radical rings with nilpotent associated groups", Trans. Roy. Soc. Canada. Sect. III. (3), 49: 31–38, MR 0073578
- Jennings, S. A. (1955), "The group ring of a class of infinite nilpotent groups", Canadian Journal of Mathematics, 7: 169–187, doi:10.4153/CJM-1955-022-5, ISSN 0008-414X, MR 0068540
- Jennings, S. A. (1954), "Substitution groups of formal power series", Canadian Journal of Mathematics, 6: 325–340, doi:10.4153/CJM-1954-031-9, ISSN 0008-414X, MR 0061610
- Jennings, S. A. (1947), "On rings whose associated Lie rings are nilpotent", Bulletin of the American Mathematical Society, 53 (6): 593–597, doi:10.1090/S0002-9904-1947-08844-3, MR 0020984
- Jennings, S. A. (1944), "A note on chain conditions in nilpotent rings and groups", Bulletin of the American Mathematical Society, 50 (10): 659–763, doi:10.1090/S0002-9904-1944-08234-7, MR 0011075
- Jennings, S. A. (1942), "Central chains of ideals in an associative ring", Duke Mathematical Journal, 9 (2): 341–355, doi:10.1215/S0012-7094-42-00924-4, MR 0006995
- Jennings, S. A. (1941), "The structure of the group ring of a p-group over a modular field", Transactions of the American Mathematical Society, 50 (1), American Mathematical Society: 175–185, doi:10.2307/1989916, JSTOR 1989916, MR 0004626
