= Suzuki group =

In the mathematical discipline known as group theory, the phrase Suzuki group refers to:

- The Suzuki sporadic group, Suz or Sz is a sporadic simple group of order 2^{13} · 3^{7} · 5^{2} · 7 · 11 · 13 = 448,345,497,600 discovered by Suzuki in 1969
- One of an infinite family of Suzuki groups of Lie type discovered by Suzuki
