= Finnerty Gardens =

Coordinates: 48°27′36.49″N 123°19′2.46″W

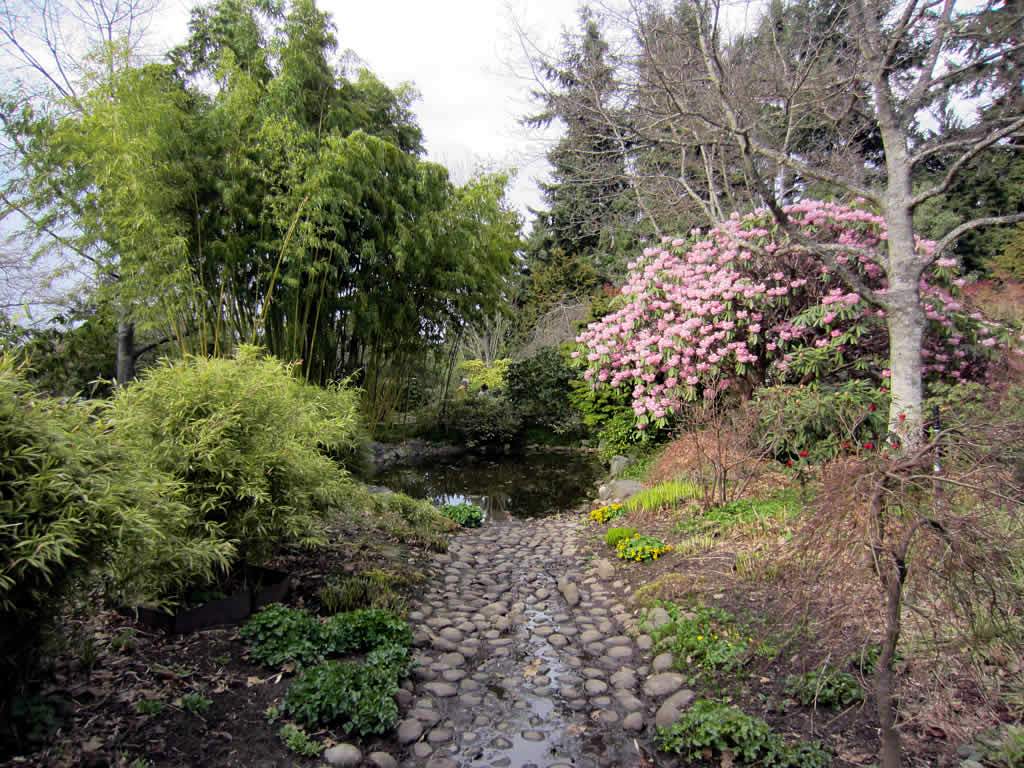
The Finnerty Gardens at the University of Victoria, Victoria, BC, Canada.

Finnerty Gardens is a public woodland garden located on and maintained by the University of Victoria in Victoria, British Columbia, Canada. Its main feature is the sizeable collection of rhododendrons artfully arranged throughout the 2.7 hectare (6.5 acre) site. There are 500 variations of rhododendrons and rhododendron hybrids on the grounds, in addition to 1,600 trees and shrubs, mostly of native varieties. There are numerous paths and benches throughout the garden winding through and around three ponds located on the site.
