= Ree group =

From an exceptional automorphism of a Dynkin diagram

In mathematics, a Ree group is a group of Lie type over a finite field. They are named after Rimhak Ree, who constructed them from an exceptional automorphism of a Dynkin diagram that reverses the direction of the multiple bonds, generalizing the Suzuki groups found by Suzuki using a different method. They were the last of the infinite families of finite simple groups to be discovered.

Unlike the Steinberg groups, the Ree groups are not given by the points of a connected reductive algebraic group defined over a finite field; in other words, there is no "Ree algebraic group" related to the Ree groups in the same way that (say) unitary groups are related to Steinberg groups. However, there are some exotic pseudo-reductive algebraic groups over non-perfect fields whose construction is related to the construction of Ree groups, as they use the same exotic automorphisms of Dynkin diagrams that change root lengths.

Tits defined Ree groups over infinite fields of characteristics 2 and 3. Tits and Hée introduced Ree groups of infinite-dimensional Kac–Moody algebras.

== Construction ==
If X is a Dynkin diagram, Chevalley constructed split algebraic groups corresponding to X, in particular giving groups X(F) with values in a field F. These groups have the following automorphisms:

- Any endomorphism σ of the field F induces an endomorphism α_{σ} of the group X(F)
- Any automorphism π of the Dynkin diagram induces an automorphism α_{π} of the group X(F).

The Steinberg and Chevalley groups can be constructed as fixed points of an endomorphism of X(F) for F the algebraic closure of a field. For the Chevalley groups, the automorphism is the Frobenius endomorphism of F, while for the Steinberg groups the automorphism is the Frobenius endomorphism times an automorphism of the Dynkin diagram.

Over fields of characteristic 2 the groups B_{2}(F) and F_{4}(F) and over fields of characteristic 3 the groups G_{2}(F) have an endomorphism whose square is the endomorphism α_{φ} associated to the Frobenius endomorphism φ of the field F. Roughly speaking, this endomorphism α_{π} comes from the order 2 automorphism of the Dynkin diagram where one ignores the lengths of the roots.

Suppose that the field F has an endomorphism σ whose square is the Frobenius endomorphism: σ^{2} = φ. Then the Ree group is defined to be the group of elements g of X(F) such that α_{π}(g) = α_{σ}(g). If the field F is perfect then α_{π} and α_{φ} are automorphisms, and the Ree group is the group of fixed points of the involution α_{φ}/α_{π} of X(F).

In the case when F is a finite field of order p^{k} (with p = 2 or 3) there is an endomorphism with square the Frobenius exactly when k = 2n + 1 is odd, in which case it is unique. So this gives the finite Ree groups as subgroups of B_{2}(2^{2n+1}), F_{4}(2^{2n+1}), and G_{2}(3^{2n+1}) fixed by an involution.

== Chevalley groups, Steinberg group, and Ree groups ==
The relation between Chevalley groups, Steinberg group, and Ree groups is roughly as follows. Given a Dynkin diagram X, Chevalley constructed a group scheme over the integers $\Z$ whose values over finite fields are the Chevalley groups. In general one can take the fixed points of an endomorphism α of X(F̅) where F̅ is the algebraic closure of a finite field, such that some power of α is some power of the Frobenius endomorphism φ. The three cases are as follows:

- For Chevalley groups, α = φ^{n} for some positive integer n. In this case the group of fixed points is also the group of points of X defined over a finite field.
- For Steinberg groups, α^{m} = φ^{n} for some positive integers m, n with m dividing n and m > 1. In this case the group of fixed points is also the group of points of a twisted (quasisplit) form of X defined over a finite field.
- For Ree groups, α^{m} = φ^{n} for some positive integers m, n with m not dividing n. In practice m=2 and n is odd. Ree groups are not given as the points of some connected algebraic group with values in a field. they are the fixed points of an order m=2 automorphism of a group defined over a field of order p^{n} with n odd, and there is no corresponding field of order p^{n/2} (although some authors like to pretend there is in their notation for the groups).

== Ree groups of type ^{2}B_{2} ==
The Ree groups of type ^{2}B_{2} were first found by Suzuki using a different method, and are usually called Suzuki groups. Ree noticed that they could be constructed from the groups of type B_{2} using a variation of the construction of Steinberg. Ree realized that a similar construction could be applied to the Dynkin diagrams F_{4} and G_{2}, leading to two new families of finite simple groups.

== Ree groups of type ^{2}G_{2} ==
The Ree groups of type ^{2}G_{2}(3^{2n+1}) were introduced by Ree, who showed that they are all simple except for the first one ^{2}G_{2}(3), which is isomorphic to the automorphism group of SL_{2}(8). Wilson gave a simplified construction of the Ree groups, as the automorphisms of a 7-dimensional vector space over the field with 3^{2n+1} elements preserving a bilinear form, a trilinear form, and a product satisfying a twisted linearity law.

The Ree group has order q^{3}(q^{3} + 1)(q − 1), where q = 3^{2n+1}.

The Schur multiplier is trivial for n ≥ 1 and for ^{2}G_{2}(3)′.

The outer automorphism group is cyclic of order 2n + 1.

The Ree group is also occasionally denoted by Ree(q), R(q), or E_{2}^{*}(q)

The Ree group ^{2}G_{2}(q) has a doubly transitive permutation representation on q^{3} + 1 points, and more precisely acts as automorphisms of an S(2, q+1, q^{3}+1) Steiner system. It also acts on a 7-dimensional vector space over the field with q elements as it is a subgroup of G_{2}(q).

The 2-sylow subgroups of the Ree groups are elementary abelian of order 8. Walter's theorem shows that the only other non-abelian finite simple groups with abelian Sylow 2-subgroups are the projective special linear groups in dimension 2 and the Janko group J1. These groups also played a role in the discovery of the first modern sporadic group. They have involution centralizers of the form Z/2Z × PSL_{2}(q), and by investigating groups with an involution centralizer of the similar form Z/2Z × PSL_{2}(5) Janko found the sporadic group J_{1}. Kleidman determined their maximal subgroups.

The Ree groups of type ^{2}G_{2} are exceptionally hard to characterize. Thompson studied this problem, and was able to show that the structure of such a group is determined by a certain automorphism σ of a finite field of characteristic 3, and that if the square of this automorphism is the Frobenius automorphism then the group is the Ree group. He also gave some complicated conditions satisfied by the automorphism σ. Finally Bombieri used elimination theory to show that Thompson's conditions implied that σ^{2} = 3 in all but 178 small cases, that were eliminated using a computer by Odlyzko and Hunt. Bombieri found out about this problem after reading an article about the classification by Gorenstein, who suggested that someone from outside group theory might be able to help solving it. Enguehard gave a unified account of the solution of this problem by Thompson and Bombieri.

== Ree groups of type ^{2}F_{4} ==
The Ree groups of type ^{2}F_{4}(2^{2n+1}) were introduced by Ree. They are simple except for the first one ^{2}F_{4}(2), which Tits showed has a simple subgroup of index 2, now known as the Tits group. Wilson gave a simplified construction of the Ree groups as the symmetries of a 26-dimensional space over the field of order 2^{2n+1} preserving a quadratic form, a cubic form, and a partial multiplication.

The Ree group ^{2}F_{4}(2^{2n+1}) has order q^{12}(q^{6} + 1) (q^{4} − 1) (q^{3} + 1) (q − 1) where q = 2^{2n+1}. The Schur multiplier is trivial. The outer automorphism group is cyclic of order 2n + 1.

These Ree groups have the unusual property that the Coxeter group of their BN pair is not crystallographic: it is the dihedral group of order 16. Tits showed that all Moufang octagons come from Ree groups of type ^{2}F_{4}.

== See also ==
- List of finite simple groups
