= Alistair Vigier =

Canadian tech CEO

Alistair Vigier is a Canadian-British entrepreneur in the technology automation industry. He was the CEO of Clearway Law and is the current CEO of Caseway.

== Early life and education ==
Vigier was born in Toronto, Ontario. He attended the University of Victoria, focusing on psychology and statistics, and pursued legal studies at the University of Birmingham in the United Kingdom.

Before embarking on his entrepreneurial ventures, he served in the Canadian Armed Forces for seven years. In 2009, while participating in Operation Podium (a military training exercise in northern British Columbia), he sustained a gunshot injury to his leg due to a training mishap and was subsequently medically discharged.

In 2013, Vigier was awarded the Victoria Police Civic Service Award for stopping a car theft.

== Career ==
After his military service, Vigier entered the legal industry in 2015, initially working at a family law firm where he was the business development manager. He grew the law firm's revenue to $3.5 million.

Several years after Vigier left the law firm, the managing partner was twice disbarred for events that happened in 2012, before Vigier joined it. Vigier later filed a lawsuit against the law firm and its managing partner, alleging negligent misrepresentation related to investments in the firm. A British Columbia court found in his favour, holding the defendants liable for misleading investors about the nature and security of the investment, and awarded damages.

He later founded Clearway Law, a lawyer rating website designed to connect users with lawyers and provide legal information. Clearway Law has faced criticism for creating online profiles of lawyers without their consent, leading to disputes over the accuracy of the information presented. Additionally, the company has been involved in debates over the legitimacy of its lawyer rating system given that users can remain anonymous.

In 2024, Vigier co-founded Caseway AI, a SaaS company that processes court decisions to assist legal professionals and the self-represented in research and contract drafting. The platform utilizes artificial intelligence to answer legal questions by using court decisions as its "AI database." Several critics on Reddit reported that Alistair Vigier has a history of being dishonest and encouraged others to share their experiences and dealings with him.

In November 2024, the Canadian Legal Information Institute (CanLII) filed a Caseway, alleging unauthorized use of its database to build Caseway's system. Vigier has denied these allegations, asserting that Caseway AI uses only publicly available court records. The case was settled in March 2026, with both parties announcing that they had “resolved all matters arising from the proceeding”, with Caseway writing in a separate release that “For the first time in the legal tech space, a dispute of this scale between a legal data institution and an AI company has concluded with a forward-looking resolution rather than a prolonged legal battle.”

In 2025, Vigier began collaborating on a grand funded by NSERC and MITACS with University of British Columbia Computer Science Assistant Professor Vered Shwartz. The project focused on increasing access to legal information for individuals via AI chatbot support instead of from a hired lawyer. In 2026 he began collaborating with Simon Fraser Computer Science Professor Angel Chang through a MITACS funded grant to study the use of LLMs in the legal information space.
