= Suzuki groups =

Infinite family of simple groups of Lie type

In the area of modern algebra known as group theory, the Suzuki groups, denoted by Sz(2^{2n+1}), ^{2}B_{2}(2^{2n+1}), Suz(2^{2n+1}), or G(2^{2n+1}), form an infinite family of groups of Lie type found by Suzuki (1960), that are simple for n ≥ 1. These simple groups are the only finite non-abelian ones with orders not divisible by 3.

== Constructions ==
=== Suzuki ===
Suzuki (1960) originally constructed the Suzuki groups as subgroups of SL_{4}(F_{2^{2n+1}}) generated by certain explicit matrices.

=== Ree ===
Ree observed that the Suzuki groups were the fixed points of exceptional automorphisms of some symplectic groups of dimension 4, and used this to construct two further families of simple groups, called the Ree groups. In the lowest case the symplectic group B_{2}(2)≈S_{6}; its exceptional automorphism fixes the subgroup Sz(2) or ^{2}B_{2}(2), of order 20. Ono (1962) gave a detailed exposition of Ree's observation.

=== Tits ===
Tits (1962) constructed the Suzuki groups as the symmetries of a certain ovoid in 3-dimensional projective space over a field of characteristic 2.

=== Wilson ===
Wilson (2010) constructed the Suzuki groups as the subgroup of the symplectic group in 4 dimensions preserving a certain product on pairs of orthogonal vectors.

== Properties ==
Let q = 2^{2n+1} and r = 2^{n}, where n is a non-negative integer.

The Suzuki groups Sz(q) or ^{2}B_{2}(q) are simple for n≥1. The group Sz(2) is solvable and is the Frobenius group of order 20.

The Suzuki groups Sz(q) have orders q^{2}(q^{2}+1)(q−1). These groups have orders divisible by 5, but not by 3.

The Schur multiplier is trivial for n>1, Klein 4-group for n=1, i. e. Sz(8).

The outer automorphism group is cyclic of order 2n+1, given by automorphisms of the field of order q.

Suzuki group are Zassenhaus groups acting on sets of size (2^{2n+1})^{2}+1, and have 4-dimensional representations over the field with 2^{2n+1} elements.

Suzuki groups are CN-groups: the centralizer of every non-trivial element is nilpotent.

=== Subgroups ===
When n is a positive integer, Sz(q) has at least 4 types of maximal subgroups.

The diagonal subgroup is cyclic, of order q – 1.

- The lower triangular (Borel) subgroup and its conjugates, of order q^{2}·(q-1). They are one-point stabilizers in a doubly transitive permutation representation of Sz(q).
- The dihedral group D_{q–1}, normalizer of the diagonal subgroup, and conjugates.
- C_{q+2r+1}:4
- C_{q–2r+1}:4
- Smaller Suzuki groups, when 2n+1 is composite.

Either q+2r+1 or q–2r+1 is divisible by 5, so that Sz(q) contains the Frobenius group C_{5}:4.

=== Conjugacy classes ===
Suzuki (1960) showed that the Suzuki group has q+3 conjugacy classes. Of these, q+1 are strongly real, and the other two are classes of elements of order 4.

- q^{2}+1 Sylow 2-subgroups of order q^{2}, of index q–1 in their normalizers. 1 class of elements of order 2, 2 classes of elements of order 4.
- q^{2}(q^{2}+1)/2 cyclic subgroups of order q–1, of index 2 in their normalizers. These account for (q–2)/2 conjugacy classes of non-trivial elements.
- Cyclic subgroups of order q+2r+1, of index 4 in their normalizers. These account for (q+2r)/4 conjugacy classes of non-trivial elements.
- Cyclic subgroups of order q–2r+1, of index 4 in their normalizers. These account for (q–2r)/4 conjugacy classes of non-trivial elements.

The normalizers of all these subgroups are Frobenius groups.

=== Characters ===
Suzuki (1960) showed that the Suzuki group has q+3 irreducible representations over the complex numbers, 2 of which are complex and the rest of which are real. They are given as follows:

- The trivial character of degree 1.
- The Steinberg representation of degree q^{2}, coming from the doubly transitive permutation representation.
- (q–2)/2 characters of degree q^{2}+1
- Two complex characters of degree r(q–1) where r=2^{n}
- (q+2r)/4 characters of degree (q–2r+1)(q–1)
- (q–2r)/4 characters of degree (q+2r+1)(q–1).
