= Mystic Vale =

Coordinates: 48.4606°N 123.3032°W

Mystic Vale is a forested ravine that was acquired by the University of Victoria, British Columbia, Canada, in 1993. It is located outside the ring road to the southeast of campus. Its tree canopy is dominated by large specimens of Douglas-fir and grand fir. A few western red cedar also occur. Scattered among these conifers are deciduous trees such as bigleaf maple, black cottonwood, and willow. Some Garry oak is present at the forest edge. Canada's only native broadleaf evergreen tree, the arbutus, is also present.

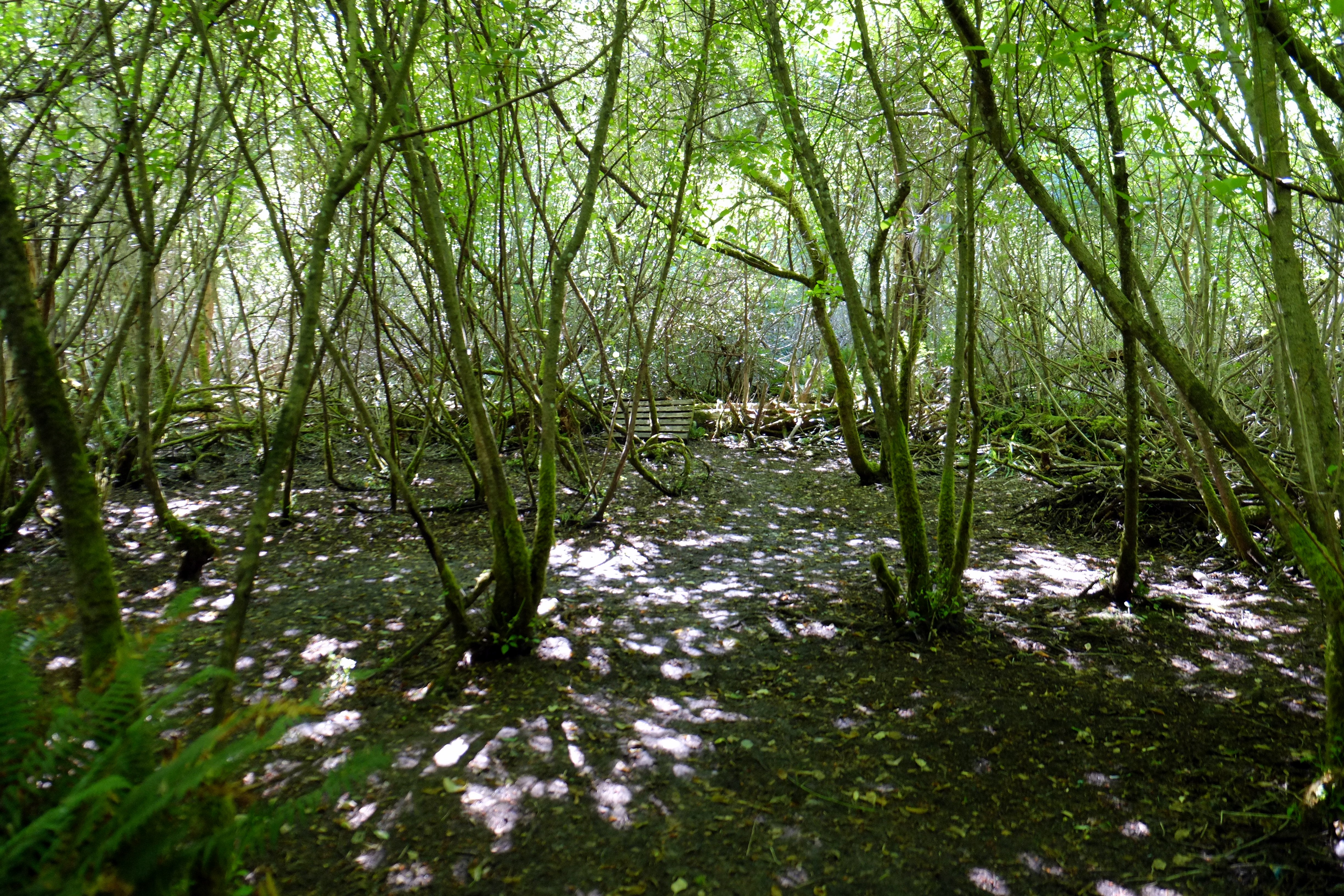
Path in Mystic Vale

Mystic Vale is one of the popular green spaces on campus as thousands of students and community members use the area each year for recreation. The university is committed to the preservation of Mystic Vale and the surrounding Haro Woods to ensure the long-term health of the area as habitat for local flora and fauna. Ecoaction groups and sustainability projects have been implemented to preserve the conditions of the ravine, including creating detention ponds to minimize stream bank erosion and removing invasive species like ivy, daphne and holly.

The area covers 4.7 hectares (11.6 acres) of natural coniferous woodland, and much of Mystic Vale and the university campus is part of the Straits Coast Salish peoples’ traditional homeland.

== Eco-system ==
The eco-system of Mystic Vale features over 75 native plant and wildlife species including oceanspray, snowberry, Indian plum and sword fern. Some species, such as rattlesnake plantain, stink currant and vanilla-leaf, are seldom found anywhere else around Victoria. The oldest verified trees in Mystic Vale are approximately 100 to 150 years old but some trees are likely between 350 and 500 years old.

A number of mammals inhabit the ravine including black-tailed deer, raccoons, eastern cottontail rabbits and bats. River otter tracks have been spotted along the creek bed and there was a rare cougar sighting in 2005. Birds found in Mystic Vale include the bald eagle, Cooper’s hawk, the great horned owl and five species of woodpeckers.

== Name ==
One suggestion for the origin of the name “Mystic Vale” is that it originates from the legend of the mystic spring. In 1904 local author D.W. Higgins gave his version of the mystic spring legend, relating how the vale was once home to a huge maple tree beside a spring of pure water; the maple tree was a god that guarded the spirit of the spring. The following quote is from Higgins’ version of this tale:

‘If a woman should look into the water when the moon is at its full she’ll see reflected in it the face of the man who loves her. If a man looks into the water he will see the woman who loves him and will marry him should he ask her. If a woman is childless this water will give her plenty. The tree is a god. It guards the spirit of the spring, and as long as the tree stands the water will creep to its foot for protection and shade; cut down the tree and the spring will be seen no more.”

Note that Higgins’ tale romanticizes the indigenous peoples’ ancestral use of Mystic Vale as a sacred site, as Mavis Henry explains, “the … mythology and legend attached [to Mystic Vale] goes beyond fable and represents real use and real belief systems at work.”

== Acquisition ==
In 1993, during the University of Victoria’s 30th anniversary celebrations, it purchased Mystic Vale for $2.7 million with help from the provincial government and the Municipality of Saanich. For thirty years the university has sought to buy Mystic Vale from shareholders. In the early 1990s, when residential development threatened the land, the university utilized local support for the conservation of Mystic Vale.

Mystic Vale’s protection was achieved through help from the Friends of Mystic Vale; the Mystic Vale Action Committee, whose membership included former University of Victoria Chancellor Dr. Bill Gibson; Saanich Mayor Murray Coell and Saanich council and Hon. Tom Perry, Minister of Advanced Education, Training and Technology.

== Protection ==
The University of Victoria uses Mystic Vale for teaching and research. UVic’s Facilities Management has developed long term plans for environmental protection, streamside remediation, and community education about the area.
