= University of Victoria =

University in Victoria, British Columbia

- Former name: Victoria College
- Motto: "Multitudo sapientium sanitas orbis" (Latin) "יְהִי אוֹר" (Hebrew)
- Motto in English: "A multitude of the wise is the health of the world" "Let there be light"
- Type: Public university
- Established: July 1, 1963; 63 years ago (Note: The following date was when Victoria College was reorganized into the University of Victoria through the provincial University Act. However, the institution traces its origins to Victoria College, which operated as an affiliated college to McGill University from 1903 to 1915; and from 1921 to 1963 as an affiliated college of the University of British Columbia.)
- Affiliations: CBIE; IAU; Universities Canada
- Endowment: $575 million (2024)
- Chancellor: Marion Buller
- President: Rhonda McEwen
- Provost: Elizabeth Croft
- Faculty: 900 faculty
- Administrative staff: 5,251 employees
- Students: 17,919 <(2024–25 FTE)
- Undergraduates: 18,790
- Postgraduates: 3,270
- Location: Greater Victoria, British Columbia, Canada; 48°27′48″N 123°18′42″W
- Campus: Suburban, 163 hectares (403 acres)
- Colours: Green; Gold; Blue; Red (Note: The University of Victoria updated its branding to feature green as a secondary colour, replacing red in its applications. Red, now referred to as 'legacy red,' remains part of the university crest but is used sparingly in specific contexts. The university notes that red is commonly associated with power and widely used in the post-secondary landscape, which influenced its limited role in current branding.)
- Nickname: Vikes
- Sporting affiliations: U Sports – Canada West; NAIA – Continental
- Mascot: Thunder (pronouns: ze/zir)
- Website: uvic.ca
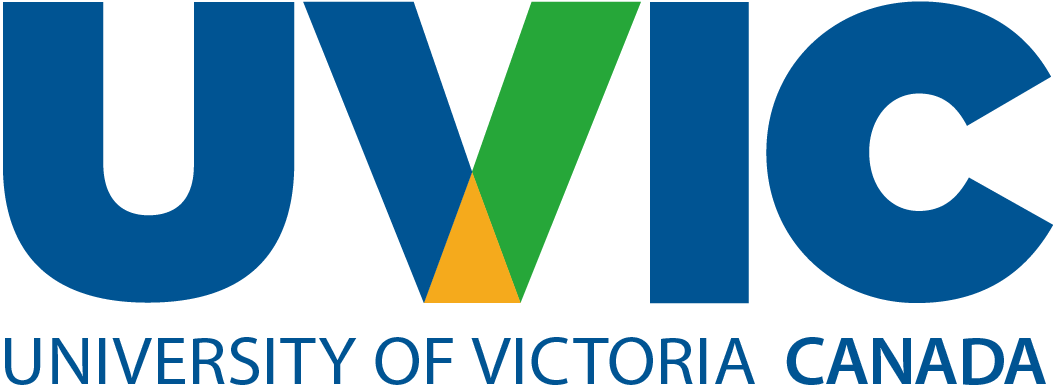

The University of Victoria (UVic) is a public research university located in the municipalities of Oak Bay and Saanich, British Columbia, Canada. It is a mid-to-large Canadian research university with strong environmental science, law, and Indigenous studies strengths, located in a coastal, nature-rich campus setting that emphasizes applied learning and sustainability.

Established in 1903 as Victoria College, the institution was initially an affiliated college of McGill University until 1915. From 1921 to 1963, it functioned as an affiliate of the University of British Columbia. In 1963, the institution was re-organized into an independent university.

The University of Victoria offers a range of graduate programs across multiple disciplines, including sciences, social sciences, humanities, and professional fields. Admission to many graduate programs is competitive and typically requires strong academic standing and supporting application materials.

== History ==
The University of Victoria is the oldest post-secondary institution in British Columbia. First established in 1903 as Victoria College, an affiliated college of McGill University, it gained full autonomy and degree-granting status through a charter on July 1, 1963.

Between 1903 and 1915, Victoria College offered first- and second-year McGill courses in the arts and sciences. Administered locally by the Victoria School Board, the college was an adjunct to Victoria High School and shared its facilities. Both institutions were under the direction of a single Principal: E.B. Paul, 1903–1908; and S.J. Willis, 1908–1915.

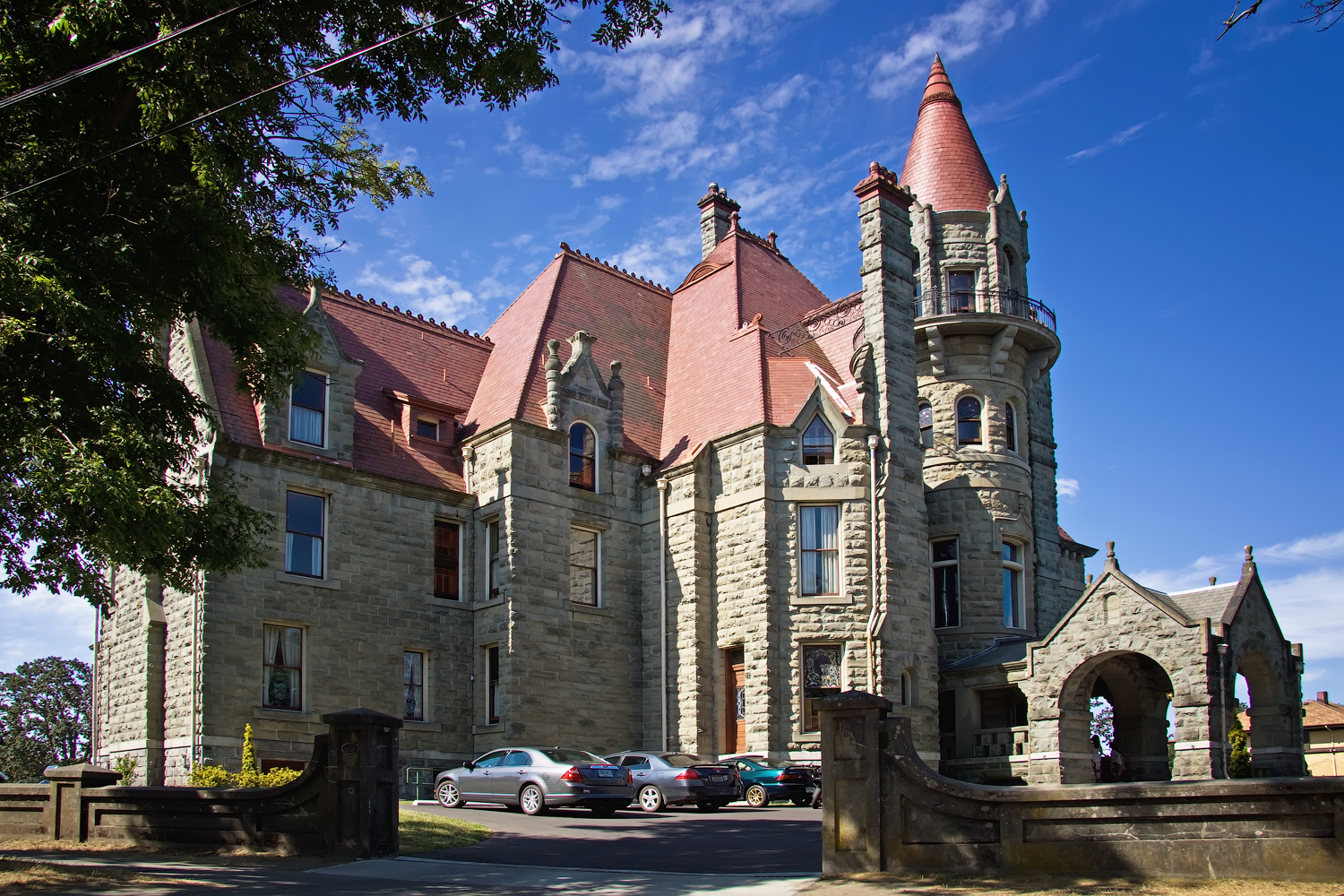
The second incarnation of Victoria College was housed in Craigdarroch Castle from 1921 to 1946

In 1915, the opening of the University of British Columbia, established by Act of Legislature in 1908, obliged the college to suspend operations in higher education in Victoria. In 1920, as a result of local demands, Victoria College began the second stage of its development, reborn in affiliation with the University of British Columbia. Though still administered by the Victoria School Board, the college was now completely separate from Victoria High School, moving in 1921 into Craigdarroch Castle. Over the next two decades, under Principals E.B. Paul and P.H. Elliott, Victoria College provided courses in first- and second-year arts and sciences. It was also during this period that future author Pierre Berton edited and served as principal cartoonist for the student newsletter, The Microscope. Between 1921 and 1944, enrolment at Victoria College seldom exceeded 250. However, in 1945, 128 servicemen returning from World War II pushed enrolment up to 400, and 600 in 1946.

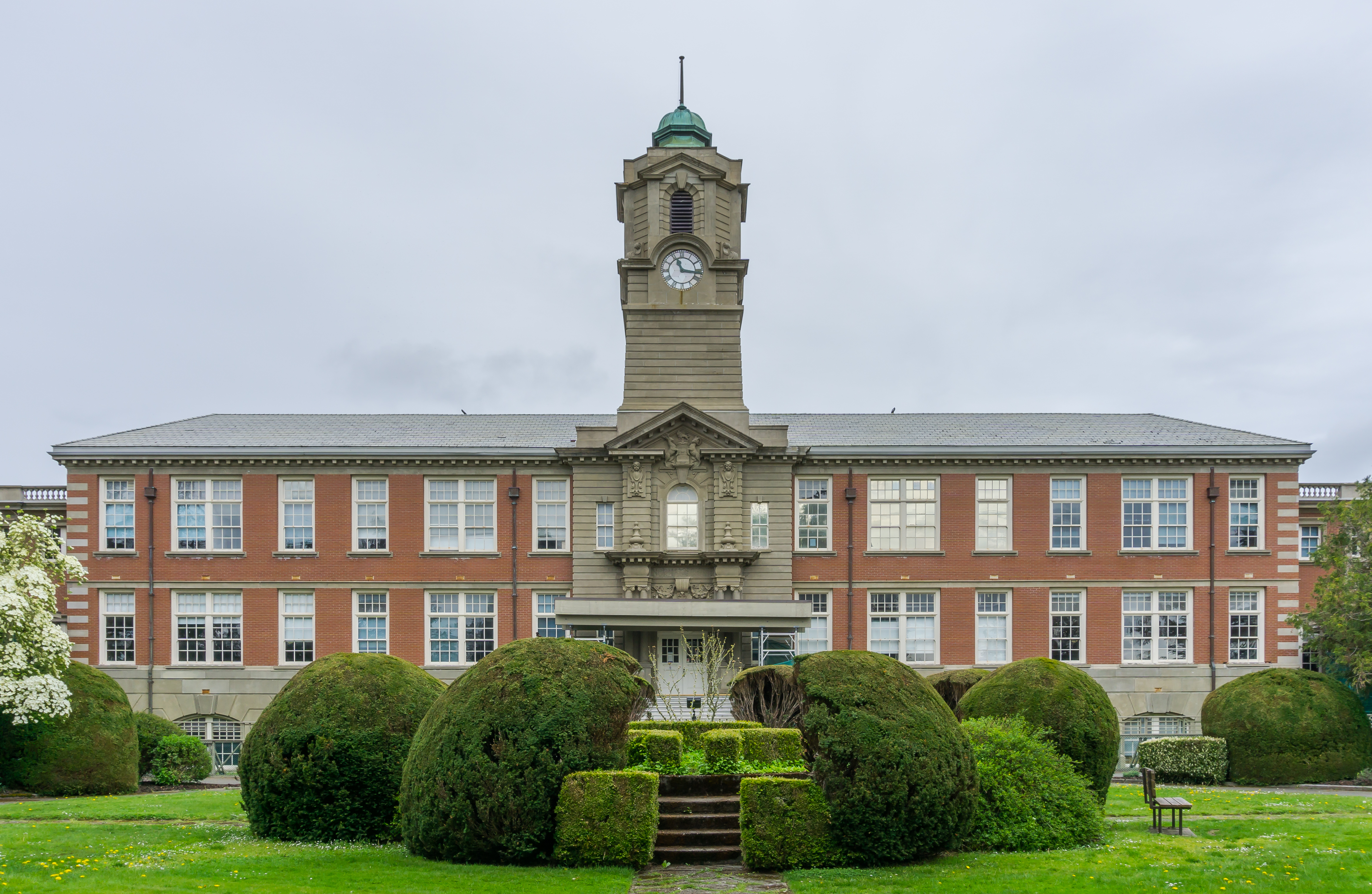
The Young building at Camosun College housed Victoria College, and its successor institution, the University of Victoria, from 1946 to 1967

The final stage was between the years 1945 and 1963. It saw the transition from two-year college to university, under Principals J.M. Ewing and W.H. Hickman. During this period, the college was governed by the Victoria College Council, representative of the parent University of British Columbia, the Greater Victoria School Board, and the provincial Department of Education. In 1946, the college was forced by postwar enrolment to move from Craigdarroch to the Lansdowne campus of the Provincial Normal School, the current location of Camosun College's Lansdowne Campus. The Normal School joined Victoria College in 1956 as its Faculty of Education. Late in this transitional period (through the cooperation of the Department of National Defence and the Hudson's Bay Company) the 284-acre (1.1 km^{2})—now 385-acre (1.6 km^{2})—campus at Gordon Head was acquired. In 1961 the college, still in affiliation with UBC, awarded its first bachelor's degrees.

In the early part of this century, professional education expanded beyond the traditional fields of theology, law and medicine. Graduate training based on the German-inspired American model of specialized coursework and the completion of a research thesis was introduced. The policy of university education initiated in the 1960s responded to population pressure and the belief that higher education was a key to social justice and economic productivity for individuals and for society.

The university gained its full autonomy in 1963 as the University of Victoria. The University Act of 1963 vested administrative authority in a chancellor elected by the convocation of the university, a board of governors, and a president appointed by the board; academic authority was given to the senate which was representative both of the faculties and of the convocation.

The university's Arms were registered on February 20, 1961 by the College of Arms in London and recogized since July 1, 1963 as the official emblem of the University of Victoria. The Arms were registered with the Canadian Heraldic Authority on April 3, 2001. The historical traditions of the university are reflected in the coat of arms, its academic regalia, and its house flag. The BA hood is solid red, recalling the early affiliation with McGill, along with the martlets in the coat of arms. The BSc hood, of gold, and the BEd hood, of blue, show the colours of the University of British Columbia. Blue and gold have been retained as the official colours. The motto at the top of the Arms, in Hebrew characters, is "Let there be Light"; the motto at the bottom, in Latin, is "A Multitude of the Wise is the Health of the World."

=== Department of Political Science Chilly Climate Report ===
On May 11, 1992, the Department of Political Science created the committee to Make the Department More Supportive to Women as a response to concerns regarding the experiences of graduate and undergraduate students. The committee was made up of five female undergraduate students and Dr. Somer Brodribb, an untenured professor working in the department. Later, this committee was unofficially called the "Chilly Climate" or Climate Committee within the department. "Chilly Climate" is a term used by the Project on the Status and Education of Women. A preliminary report published by the Climate Committee to the Department of Political Science on March 23, 1993, which looked at the experience of both faculty and students at the University of Victoria issued recommendations that, in their eyes, would make the department more hospitable to female students while also highlighting the experiences of female students which the committee found troubling. These recommendations included the establishment of a committee for addressing issues that were raised in the report, the creation of formal policies addressing race and gender discrimination, and workshops for faculty on race and gender issues in the classroom environment. Notably, the preliminary report also highlighted the importance of including classroom content from feminist perspectives and more texts authored by female scholars.

In response to this report, tenured professors of the political science department Robert Bedeski, Colin Bennett, Ron Cheffins, Warren Magusson, Terry Morley, Norman Ruff, Rob Walker, and Jeremy Wilson challenged what they perceived to be slander from Dr. Brodribb, who chaired the committee. They requested that Dr. Brodribb allow an investigation into the allegations of sexist behaviour in the Chilly Climate report. Dr. Bodribb refused, stating that this went against the agreement her committee made with the women interviewed and could expose them to further discrimination. If the evidence was not handed over the tenured professors requested a complete withdrawal of the statements made in the Chilly Climate report and an apology that would be distributed to all those who saw the report. They also mentioned seeking further action if Dr. Brodribb did neither of these things. To review documents related to the report, one can go to the University of Victoria Libraries Special Collections.

A review committee was established by University of Victoria President David Strong, requesting advice from lawyers Beth Bilson and Thomas R. Berger to assist in evaluating the climate of the political science department. They published a report in August 1993, which included recommendations that Strong later endorsed.

== Campus and grounds ==
The campus is situated 6km north-east of downtown Victoria and is spread over 403 acres. UVic also has an offsite study centre at the Jeanne S. Simpson Field Studies Resource Center in Lake Cowichan. Despite its name, no part of the university's main campus is located in the City of Victoria proper, instead split between the municipalities of Saanich and Oak Bay. The campus is several hundred feet from the Pacific Ocean at Cadboro Bay. The six-hectare Queenswood campus was acquired from the Sisters of St. Ann and converted into a national laboratory. The Legacy Art Gallery on Yates Street and a proposed redevelopment on Broad Street make up the properties owned by the university in downtown Victoria.

The University of Victoria's campus was designed in part by American architectural firm Wurster, Bernardi & Emmons, which had previously completed major buildings at Stanford University and UC Berkeley. The principles and concept of the original design are still being followed, with the academic portions of the campus located inside the Ring Road, forming a perfect circle 600 m (1,969 ft) in diameter.

The following is a list of prominent buildings on the University of Victoria campus:

- Bob Wright Centre – Home to the School of Earth & Ocean Sciences, the Department of Chemistry, and the Canadian Centre for Climate Modelling & Analysis (CCCMA). Also features the Department of Astronomy dome and telescopes, lecture theatres, offices, meeting rooms, labs, and SciCafe dining outlet.
- Business and Economics Building – Besides the obvious, the Business and Economics building also houses the offices of senior university administrators and contains a student computing facility.
- Centre of Accessible Learning "CAL" – Facilitates academic accommodations for students with accessible needs and extra support with professors, as well as full serve note taking services which is fee based, and a Learning Assistance Program that helps navigate courses and assist with time management and planning for individual needs
- Campus Security Services – Security Officers patrol and respond to Campus needs, provide first aid, and maintain a safe campus. The office also contains parking services, emergency planning, and lost & found.

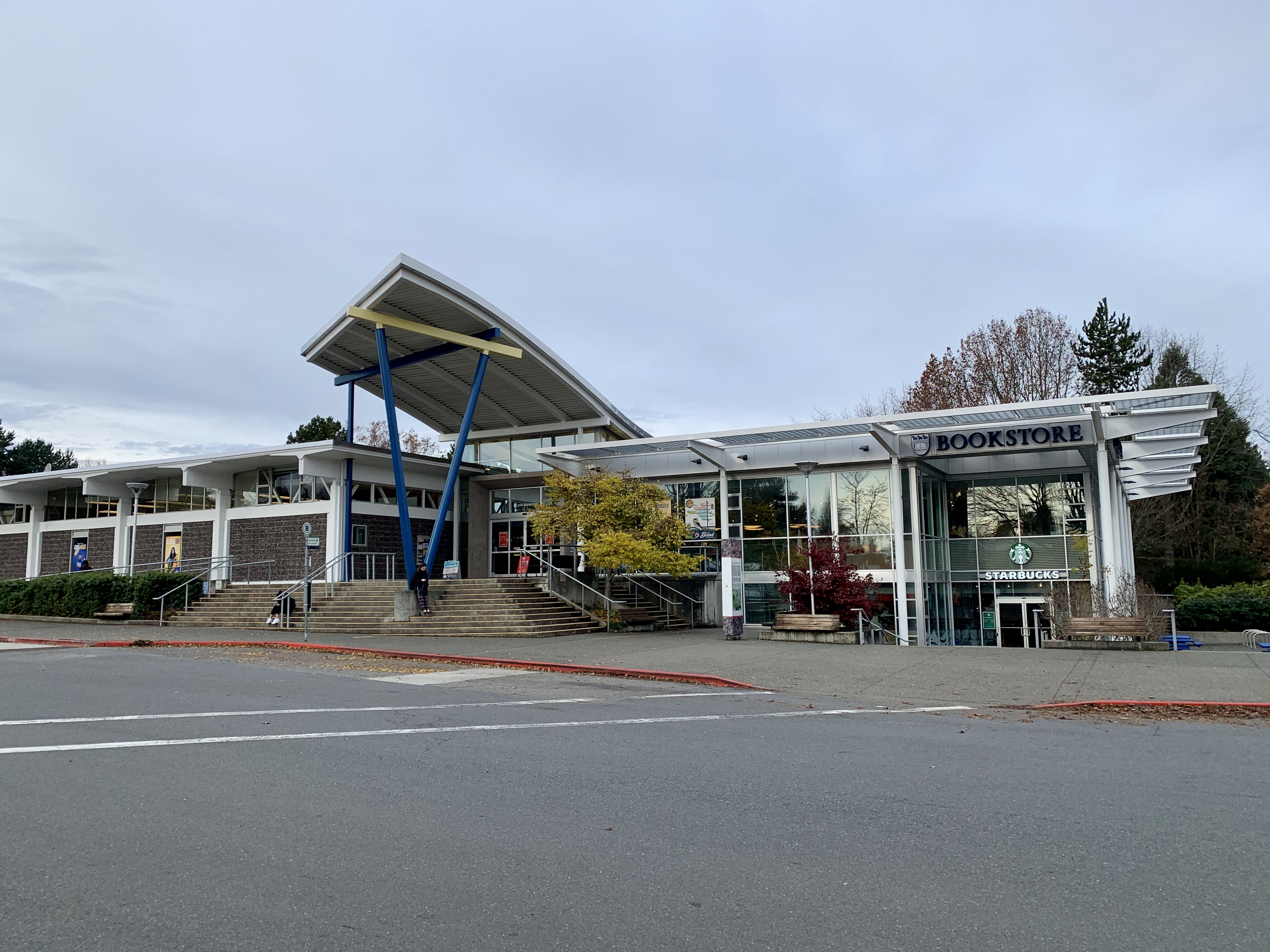
Exterior of the UVic Bookstore.

- Campus Services Building – Includes Career Services, the UVic Bookstore, the Computer Store, the Centre for Accessible Learning, and a Starbucks. Located near Campus bookstore and Bus loop.

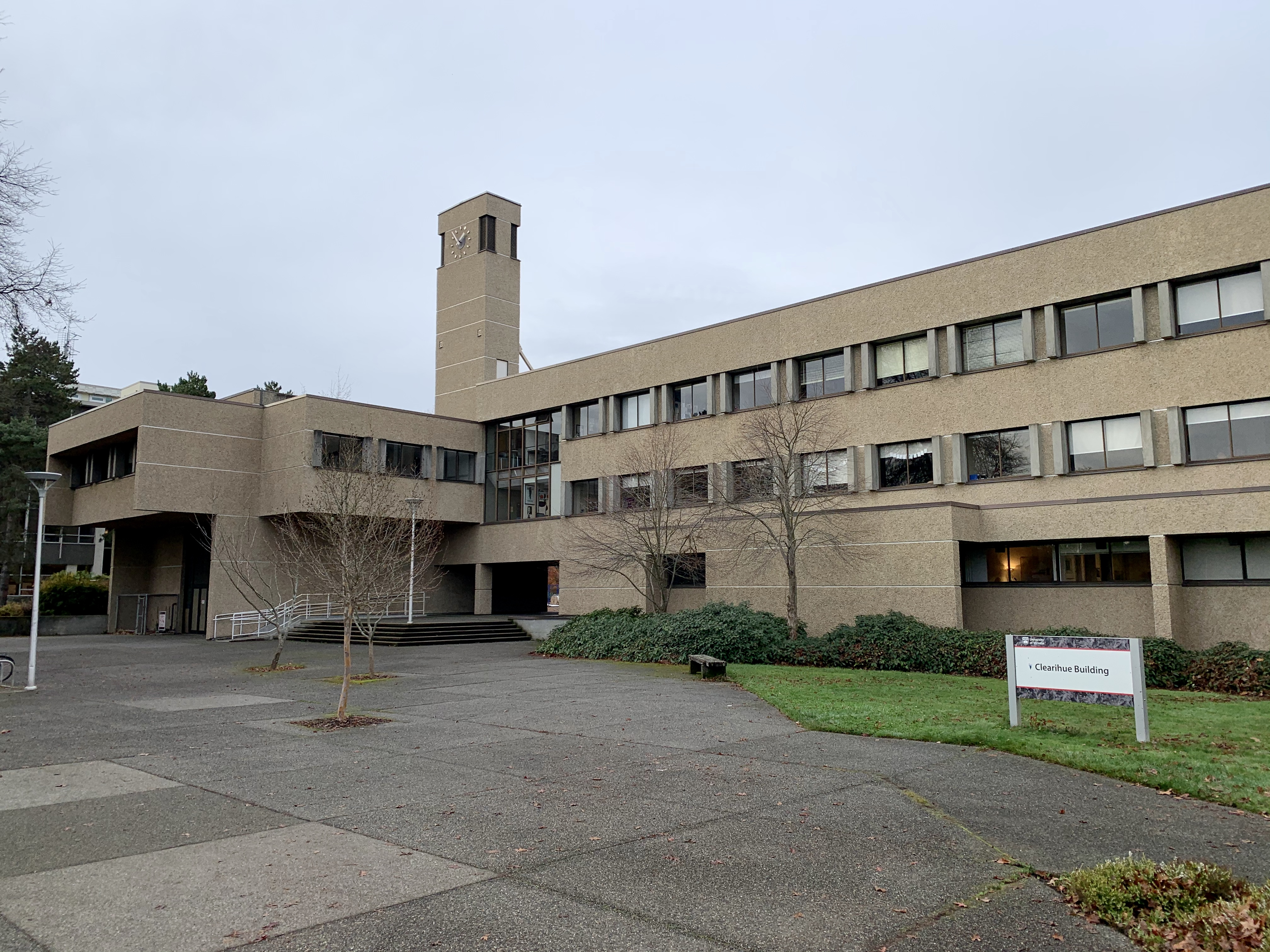
The Clearihue building houses the Faculty of Humanities and the Department of University Systems.

- CARSA Building – CARSA is the Centre for Athletics, Recreation and Special Abilities on the UVic campus. It houses the UVic Vikes athletics and recreation programs, as well as offices, labs and a machine shop for CanAssist, which develops customized technologies, programs and services for people living with disabilities.
- Čeqʷəŋín ʔéʔləŋ (Cheko’nien House) – Completed in 2023, Čeqʷəŋín ʔéʔləŋ combines student residences and a primary dining facility (The Cove) for students. The building has an Indigenous name to acknowledge the Songhees and Esquimalt nations.
- Clearihue Building – Organized around a central court (or quadrangle), it is home to the Faculty of Humanities, houses the Departments of English, French, Germanic and Slavic Studies, Greek and Roman Studies, Hispanic and Italian Studies, History, Linguistics, Medieval Studies, Pacific and Asian Studies, Philosophy, and Gender Studies. Contains numerous classrooms as well as student computing facilities, including the Computer Assisted Language Learning (CALL) facility and the Computer Help Desk. It is the location of the Department of University Systems, which is largely responsible for the systems, networking and support of the university, including student computing facilities and language labs. Clearihue is the oldest building on campus, originally constructed in 1962 and augmented by an addition in 1971. It is named after Joseph Clearihue, who was chairman of Victoria College from 1947 until it gained university status in 1963. In 2013, the Clearihue Building underwent a major $15 million redevelopment. Recognizable across campus for its clock tower, the Clearihue clock is notoriously stuck at 1:55 (pictured).
- Cornett Building – A sprawling complex of different courts and staircases, which includes classrooms and houses the Departments of Anthropology, Psychology, and Sociology. The Cornett Building is often described by freshmen undergraduates as being an unrelenting maze.

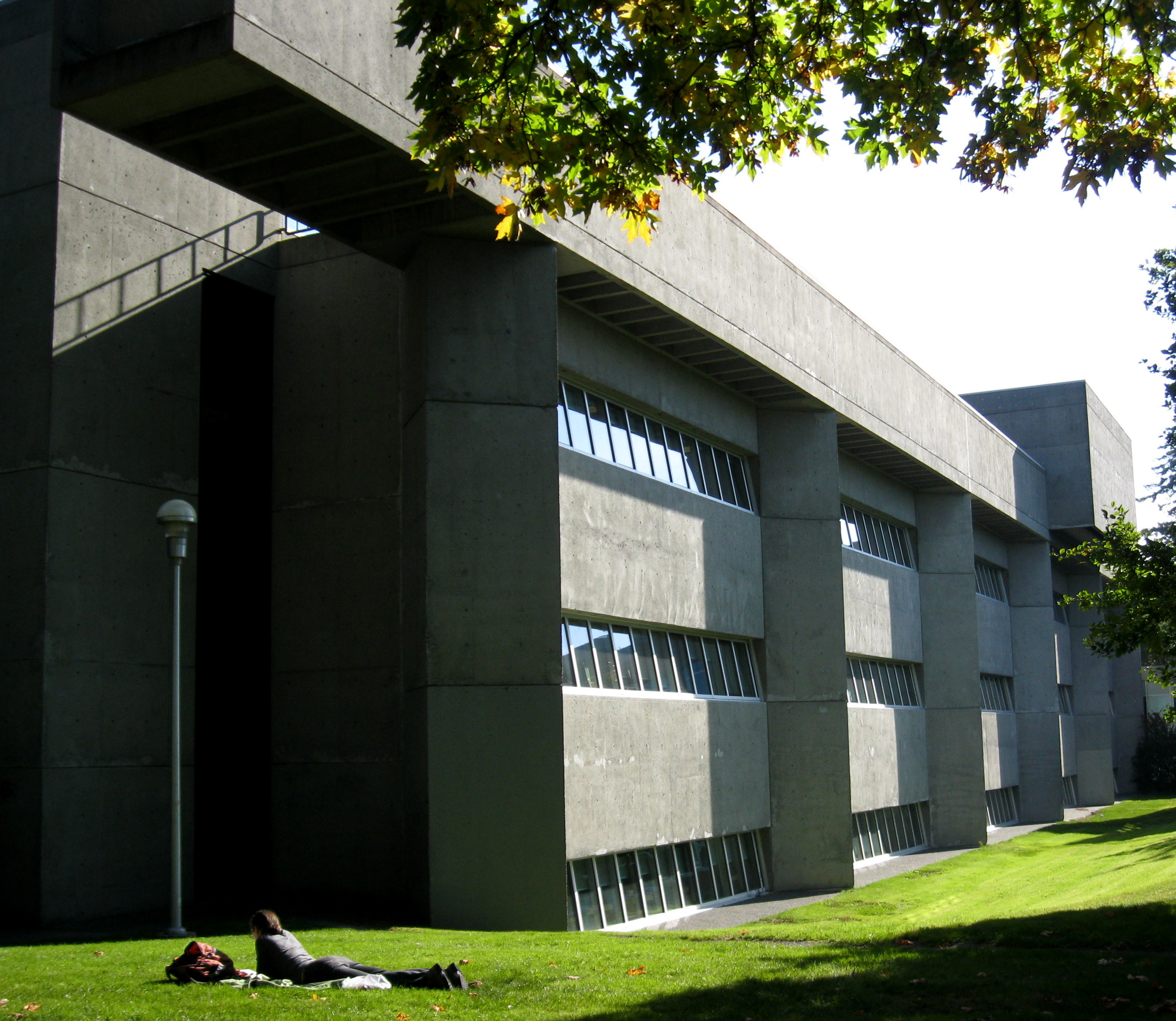
The Cunningham Building houses the Department of Biology as well as the Centre for Forest Biology.

- Cunningham Building – Contains the Department of Biology, the Centre for Forest Biology, a herbarium, and numerous specialized research facilities.
- David Strong Building – Contains classroom spaces, including seminar rooms, breakout rooms, and the Mathews and McQueen auditorium.
- David Turpin Building – The David Turpin Building is best known as the home of the Geography Department. The building also includes the School of Environmental Studies, Statistics, and Mathematics. The Turpin Building also hosts the government-funded Water & Climate Impacts Research Centre (W-CIRC). It includes a grass roof and LEED energy-efficient engineering.
- Elliott Building – Includes the Departments of Chemistry and Physics and Astronomy, as well as a number of offices, classrooms, and laboratories. The building is topped by the Climenhaga Observatory.
- Engineering Buildings – Includes the Engineering Office Wing (EOW), the Engineering Lab Wing (ELW) and the Engineering/Computer Science building (ECS). Home to the Faculty of Engineering and Computer Science, which includes the Departments of Biomedical Engineering, Civil Engineering, Computer Science, Electrical and Computer Engineering, Mechanical Engineering and Software engineering.
- Fine Arts Building – Contains the departments of Writing and History in Art as well as many offices, classrooms, a major lecture theatre, a photography darkroom, Arts Place dining outlet, and a multi-purpose lobby that may be used for readings and performances.

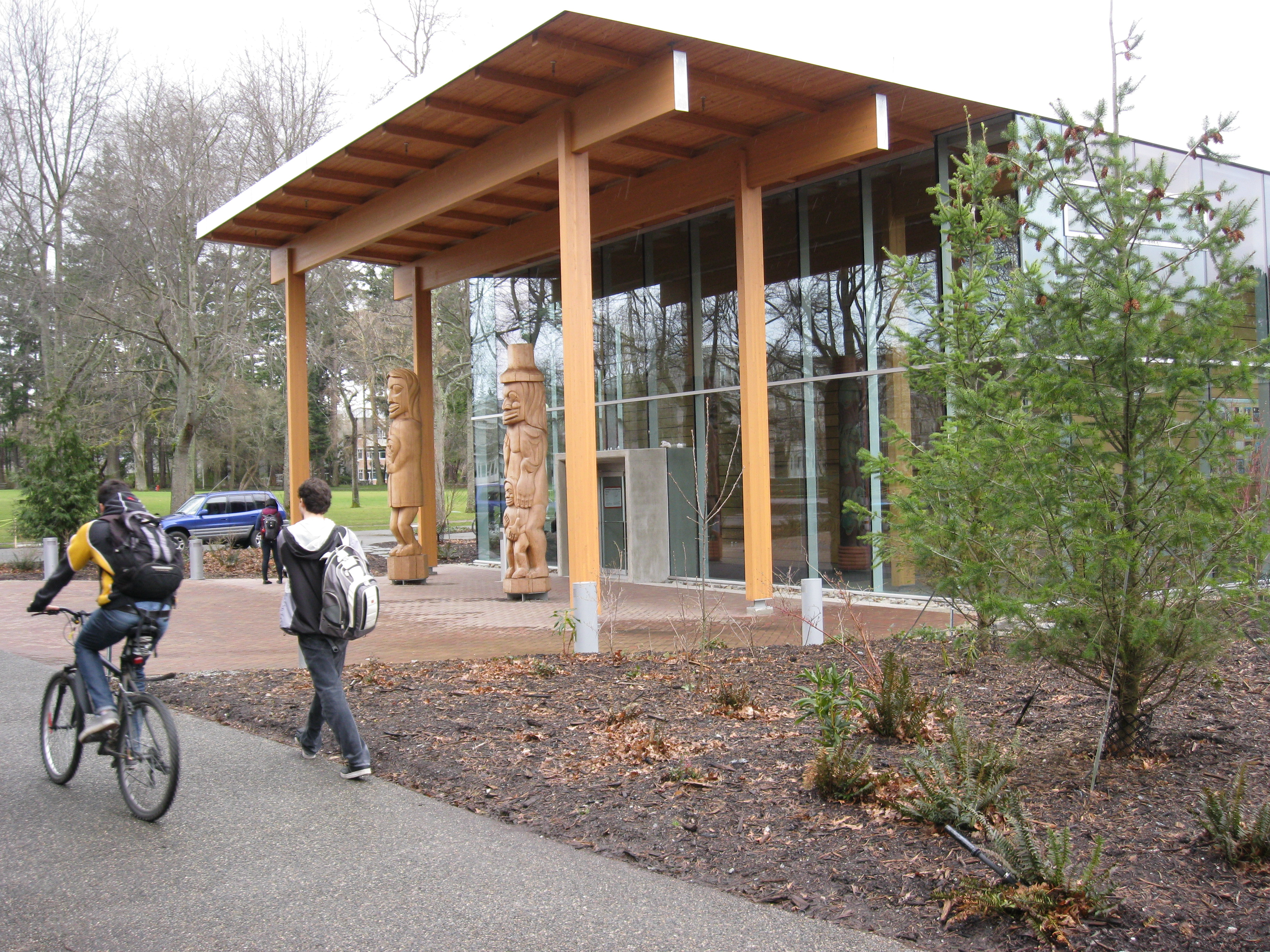
First Peoples House serves as a cultural, social, and academic centre for Indigenous students at the university.

- First Peoples House – Anthropological building that provides for Indigenous students. Features two large statues in front of the modern, glass building. It is located between Centre Quadrangle and West Quad.
- Fraser Building – Formerly known as the Begbie Building. Houses the Faculty of Law and the Institute for Dispute Resolution. The building also contains classrooms, seminar rooms, a moot courtroom, and the Diana M. Priestly Law Library.
- Halpern Centre for Graduate Students – Colloquially known as "The Grad Centre", the building houses the Graduate Student Society (GSS) general office, the "Grad House" restaurant, which is open to the public, and the David Clode lounge. There is also a meeting space (boardroom) that can be booked by contacting the GSS Office.
- Hickman Building – Formerly called the Centre for Innovative Teaching. Includes "Smart" classrooms featuring closed-circuit cameras and remote projection systems to link teachers and students with classrooms at remote locations.
- Human and Social Development Building – Classrooms and offices for Child and Youth Care, Dispute Resolution, Health Information Science, Indigenous Governance, Nursing, Public Administration, and Social Work.
- Ian Stewart Complex – A former recreational facility containing tennis courts, squash/racquetball courts, an outdoor pool, a dance studio, a physiotherapy clinic, a gym, and a weight room. Only the ice rink remains in use, as other services have moved to McKinnon and CARSA. Also contains the Alumni Services, Development, Corporate Relations, and Advancement Services departments. Currently being redeveloped as part of a major expansion to house more post-graduates and international students.
- Jamie Cassels Centre – Formerly known as University Centre and renamed in 2020 after departing President Jamie Cassels. Adjacent to the West Quad, the Centre is a major complex with a distinctive copper roof. It includes the Registrar's Offices, as well as many administrative departments (e.g., Admissions, Accounting, Payroll, Academic Advising for Humanities, Science & Social Sciences, Career Services), the secondary dining facility (Mystic Market), and the Farquhar Auditorium.
- MacLaurin Building – An extensive modernist complex which includes the Faculty of Education and School of Music, as well classrooms, the David Lam Auditorium, and Mac's Bistro.
- McKinnon Building – Encompasses the School of Exercise Science, Physical and Health Education, an indoor swimming pool, fitness and weight room, dance studio, outdoor tennis courts, squash courts and a gymnasium.
- William C. Mearns Centre for Learning – McPherson Library – The Mearns Centre for Learning – McPherson Library is the major research library of the University of Victoria. It houses the university's extensive holdings, including the university archives, special collections, and the map library. Following a major donation, the 2008 expansion to the McPherson Library created the William C. Mearns Centre for Learning, which contains the Learning Commons, Digital Scholarship Commons, Special Collections & University Archives, a Historic Computing Lab, the Farallon Book Arts Lab, classrooms and group study rooms.
- Medical Sciences Building – The home of the Island Medical Program and future home of the University of Victoria Medical School.
- Michael Williams Building – Formerly known as the Administrative Services Building. Accommodates the university's executive team as well as other administrative functions such as accounting, research services, pension, and payroll.
- Petch Building – Houses the Department of Microbiology and Biochemistry and the School of Earth and Ocean Sciences.
- Exterior of the Phoenix Theatre
  Phoenix Theatre – A major academic building notably located outside of Ring Road, it serves as the home of the Theatre department and includes many offices and classrooms. It has three theatre stages; the Chief Dan George Theatre (thrust), the Roger Bishop Theatre (proscenium), and the Barbara McIntyre Studio (black box).
- Sedgewick Buildings – An advanced research complex which houses the Centre for Asia-Pacific Initiatives (CAPI), Centre on Aging, Centre for the Study of Religion in Society, and Centre for Global Studies; as well as fundraising and administration offices.
- Student Union Building – Popularly known as the "SUB", it houses a movie theatre, restaurants, a stationery store, several book vendors, and the headquarters of several clubs, societies, and campus organizations, including the University of Victoria radio station (CFUV). There is also a large student bar located in the SUB, known as Felicita's Campus Pub.
- Student Wellness Centre – Provides current students (not alumni) with primary care and mental health support, as well as counselling services and religion spiritual care. It is staffed with medical doctors (including a psychiatrist), nurses and counsellors. The Centre can also assist students with documentation related to academic concession (a University of Victoria policy that allows students to defer exams or coursework, aegrotats as well as late withdrawals from courses under extenuating circumstances).
- World War II Army Facilities – Nine single-storey, wood-frame utilitarian hut facilities from the Second World War (1940) on the northern part of the University of Victoria campus. These structures are retained for their historical significance and are listed on the Registry of Historic Places of Canada.

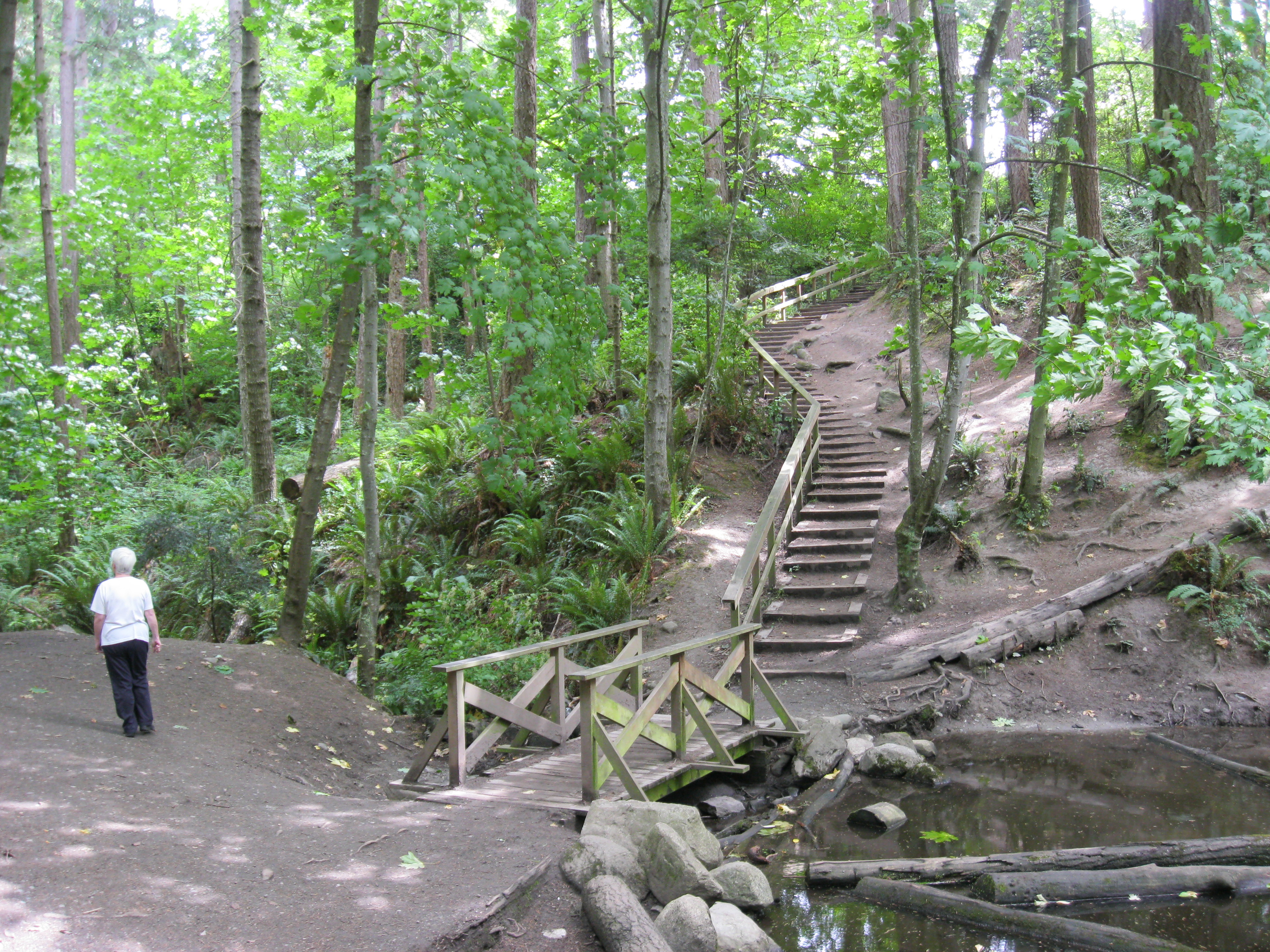
The Mystic Vale is a forested ravine acquired by the university in 1993.

The university offers on-campus housing for over 3,200 students. A variety of housing is available, including single and double dormitories, Cluster Housing (apartment-style housing with four people per unit), bachelor and one-bedroom apartments, and family housing. Four buildings in one of the oldest residential complexes at the university are named for Emily Carr, Arthur Currie, Margaret Newton, and David Thompson. Construction on the South Tower Complex was completed in January 2011. The largest residence building in terms of capacity is Cheko'nien House, which holds 398 beds. The campus has become increasingly cycling-friendly.

Much of the university estate and endowment lands have been preserved as a nature setting, notably Finnerty Gardens and Mystic Vale, a 4.4 ha (11 acres) forested area and park. The large campus is home to deer, owls, ravens, squirrels and many other wild animals native to the area. A large population of domestic rabbits was previously a feature of the campus. In May 2010, the university began trapping and euthanizing the rabbits as they had been known to put athletes at risk in the playing fields and cause extensive damage to university grounds.

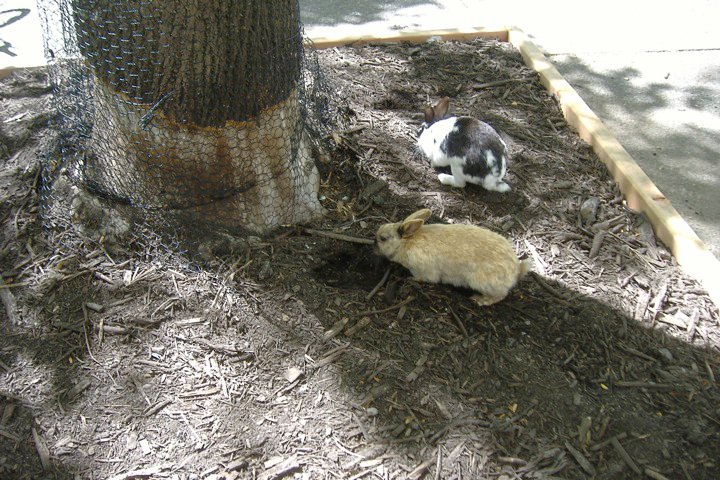
Rabbits dig holes by a tulip tree (Liriodendron tulipifera) they girdled in front of the McPherson Library, 23 May 2010.

Local veterinarians offered to perform neutering of the male rabbits. As of July 2011, the UVic campus is free of rabbits. 900 rabbits were saved and sent to shelters. The majority of rabbits moved to shelters died between 2011 and 2016, after which the remaining survivors (147 rabbits) were relocated to a private sanctuary in Alberta.

=== Libraries and museum ===
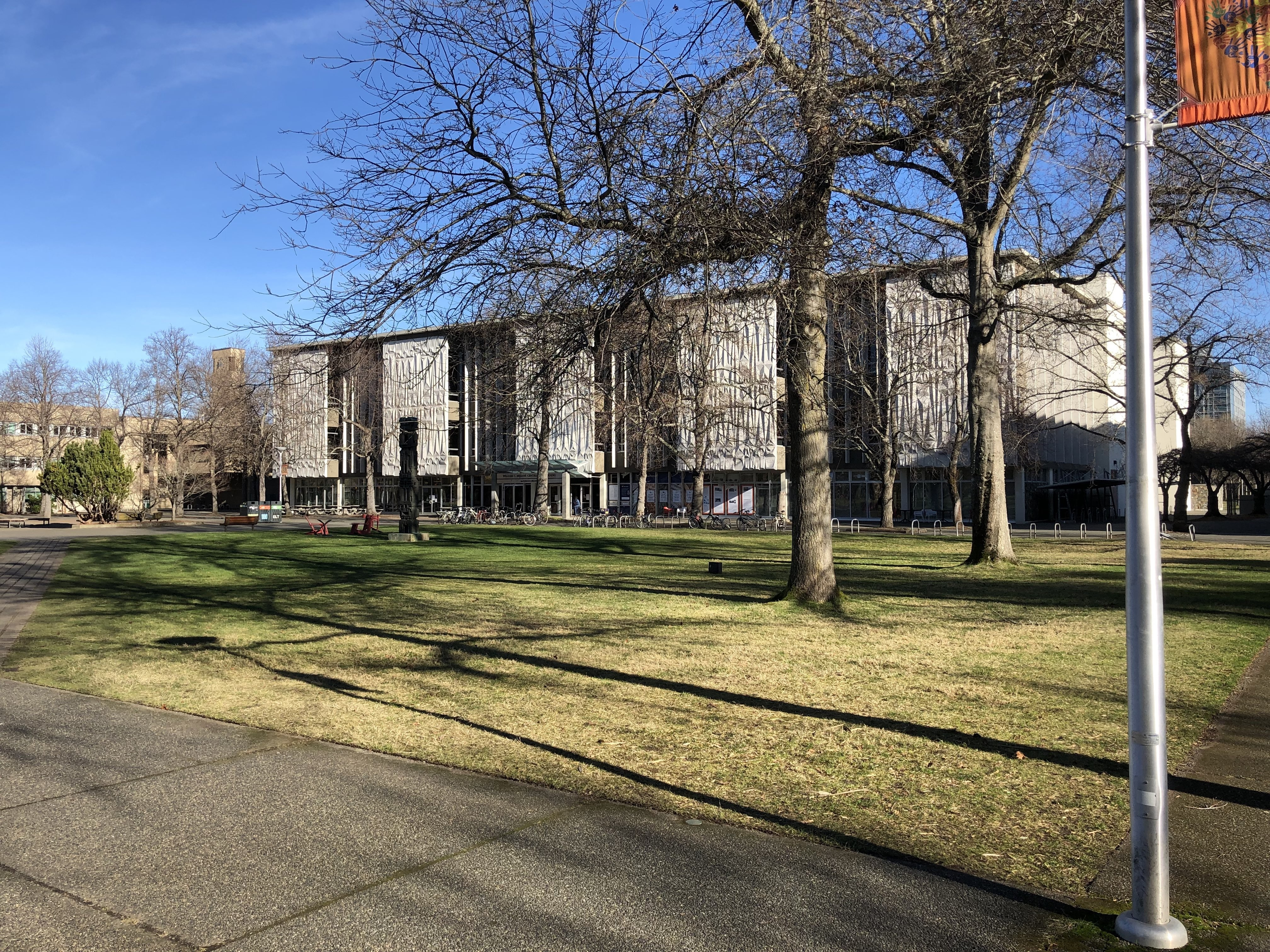
The Mearns Centre for Learning -McPherson Library is one of two libraries at the University of Victoria.

The University of Victoria Libraries system is composed of two libraries: the William C. Mearns Centre for Learning – McPherson Library and the Diana M. Priestly Law Library. UVic Libraries has undergone significant growth in recent years thanks to the university's investment in library purchases and research. Amongst the highlights from Special Collections & University Archives are:

- Institutional records of the University of Victoria, Victoria College, and the Provincial Normal School, and related organizations
- Archives of leading faculty members, Anarchist Studies
- Arts and Culture, including artists archives
- Environmental Studies, including archives of scientists and regional organizations
- Transgender Archives and the Victoria Women's Movement Archives
- Legal History, including Indigenous laws
- Literature and Literary Criticism, including Modernist British, American and Anglo-Irish literature
- Medieval and Early Modern manuscripts and fragments
- Military History, including oral histories and BC Political History
- Victoria, Vancouver Island and West Coast History

Renovations and construction included new Special Collections & University Archives classrooms, an innovative Learning Commons, the addition of Tek Booths, an expanded student lounge, and the Legacy Maltwood gallery space. The UVic Libraries collection includes over 4 million physical and electronic resources, almost 200,000 journals and 985 databases.

The University of Victoria Libraries has a unique collection of textbooks used in British Columbia’s public schools since the province joined confederation in 1871. This historical textbooks collection includes books on a variety of school subjects including science, math, health, English and language arts, foreign languages, history, and social studies.

The University of Victoria’s Legacy Art Galleries has two locations––Legacy Downtown and Legacy Maltwood at UVic Libraries––which host loan exhibitions and show the works of local artists, students, and faculty.

The University Art Collection, founded in 1953 by Dr. W.H. Hickman, Principal of Victoria College (1953–1963), consists of 6,000 works, mainly by contemporary artists living in British Columbia. The Maltwood Art Museum and Gallery, founded through the bequest of English sculptor and antiquarian Katharine Emma Maltwood (1878–1961) and her husband John Maltwood (d. 1967), reflects their varied taste which included Arts and Crafts, and English Gothic and Tudor periods. The collection of 12,000 works of fine, decorative and applied arts includes Asian ceramics, costumes, rugs, seventeenth-century English furniture, Canadian paintings and Katherine Maltwood's own sculptures.

==== Transgender Archives ====
The Transgender Archives are a part of the University of Victoria Libraries and are committed to preserving the histories of pioneering activists, community leaders, and researchers who have made contributions to the betterment of trans, non-binary, and Two-spirit people.

=== Off-campus facilities ===
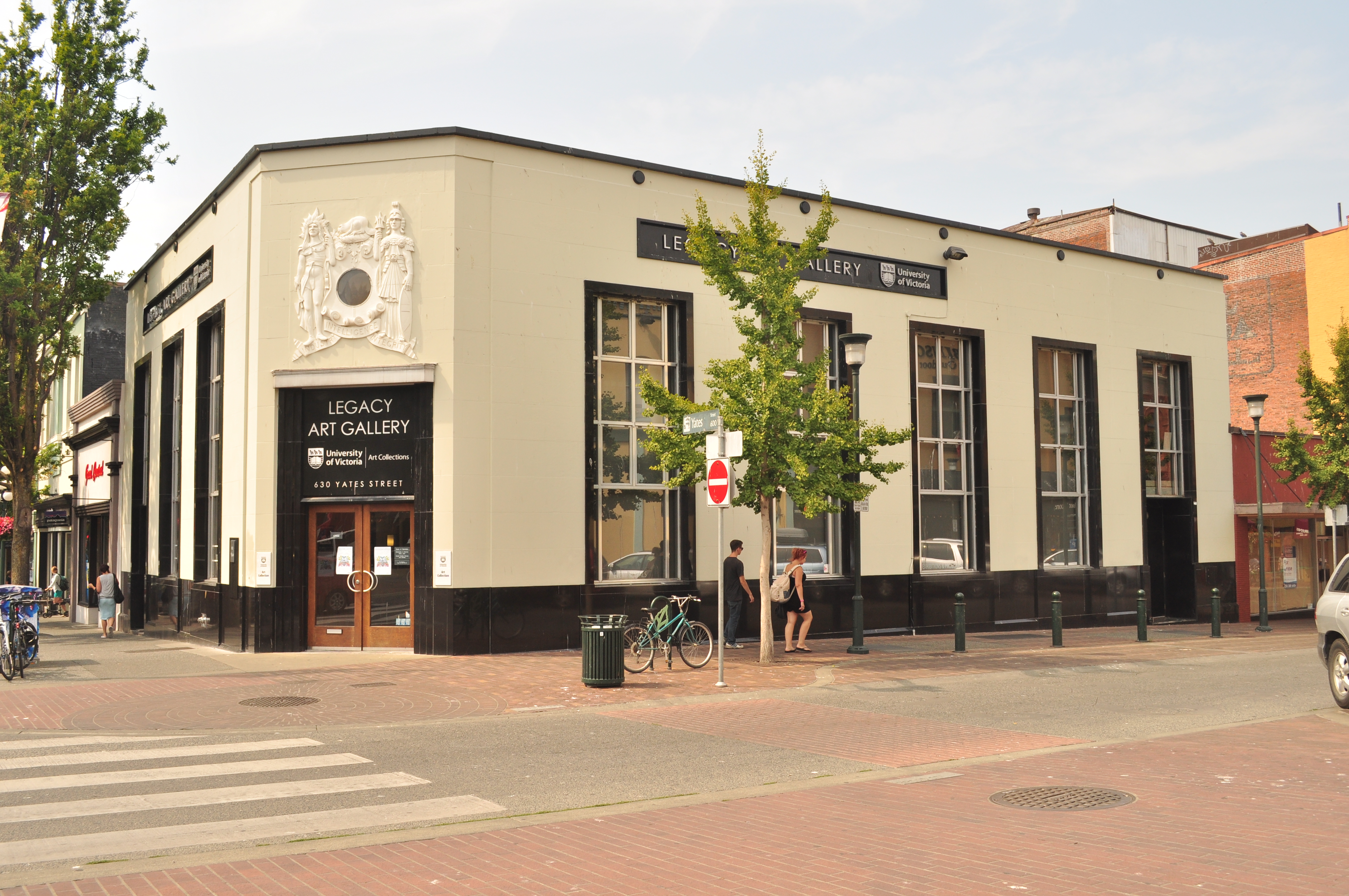
The Legacy Gallery in downtown Victoria is one of several off-campus properties owned by the university.

The University of Victoria has acquired a portfolio of properties around Victoria, British Columbia, and across Vancouver Island. These include the Legacy Gallery in downtown Victoria, the University Club, the Inter-urban campus, a former Saanich-based lodge and retreat, the Swans Hotel and Restaurant complex, and the Queenswood Property. The large, partially forested Queenswood property has been proposed as a site of future expansion for the university.

In 2017, the University of Victoria announced plans to develop a downtown campus/accommodation centre in the historic area of Victoria, BC including accommodation for students and other facilities. The new downtown campus will be centred in buildings donated to the university and located around the historic Broad Street area, beside the old Bay Centre. The downtown development has been suggested as a possible future home for UVic's Peter B. Gustavson School of Business.

The UVic endowment (estimated at $374 million) and large private donations have allowed for the university's estate to continue growing and for facilities to be upgraded and expanded on an ongoing basis.

== Administration ==
Below is a list of undergraduate faculties, departments, and schools within the University of Victoria system.

- Education
- Engineering and Computer Science
- Fine Arts, which includes Art History & Visual Studies, Music, Theatre, Visual Arts, and writing.
- Health, which includes Exercise Science, Physical & Health Education, Health Information Science, Medical Sciences, Nursing, Public Health & Social Policy, and Social Work
- Humanities
- Law, which includes the Juris Doctor (J.D.) program and Juris Indigenarum Doctor (JID)
- Peter B. Gustavson School of Business, which includes Commerce
- Science, which includes the departments of Biochemistry and Microbiology, Biology, Chemistry, Earth and Ocean Sciences, Mathematics and Statistics, and Physics and Astronomy
- Social Sciences, which includes Anthropology, Economics, Environmental Studies, Geography, Indigenous Governance, Political Science, Psychology, Public Administration, and Sociology

UVic also offers a number of interdisciplinary undergraduate programs, including Applied Ethics, Arts of Canada, European Studies, Film Studies, Human Dimensions of Climate Change, Indigenous Studies, Latin American Studies, Social Justice Studies, and Technology and Society.

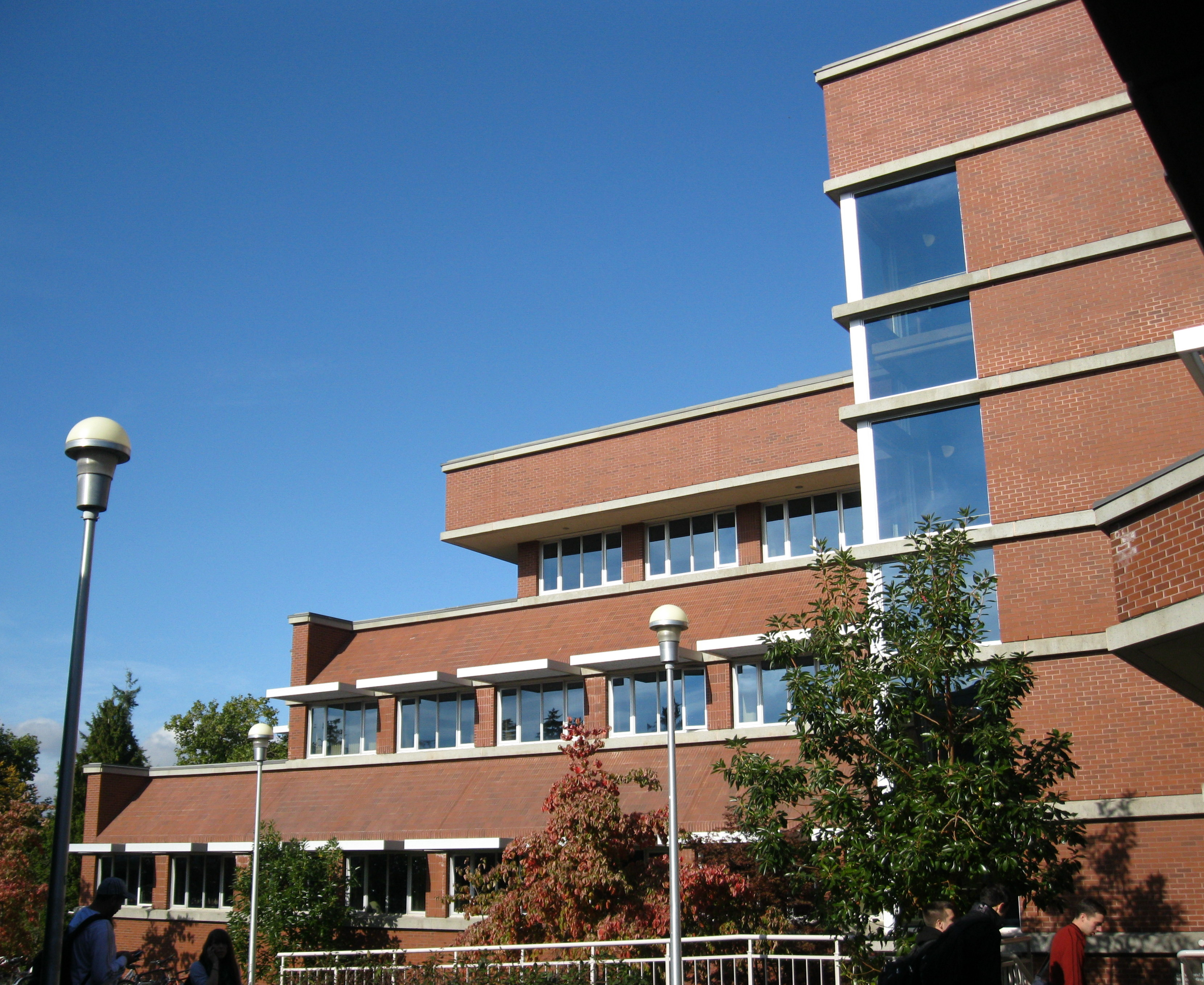
The Peter B. Gustavson School of Business is located at the university's Business and Economics Building.

=== Peter B. Gustavson School of Business ===
The Peter B. Gustavson School of Business, formerly the Faculty of Business, was renamed following a donation by local entrepreneur Peter B. Gustavson. The school, which is EQUIS and AACSB accredited, offers a wide range of programs, including BCom, MBA and other business degrees. The program starts with two years of general studies (with six required classes), followed by business-intensive 3rd and 4th years. Three co-op work terms are also required.

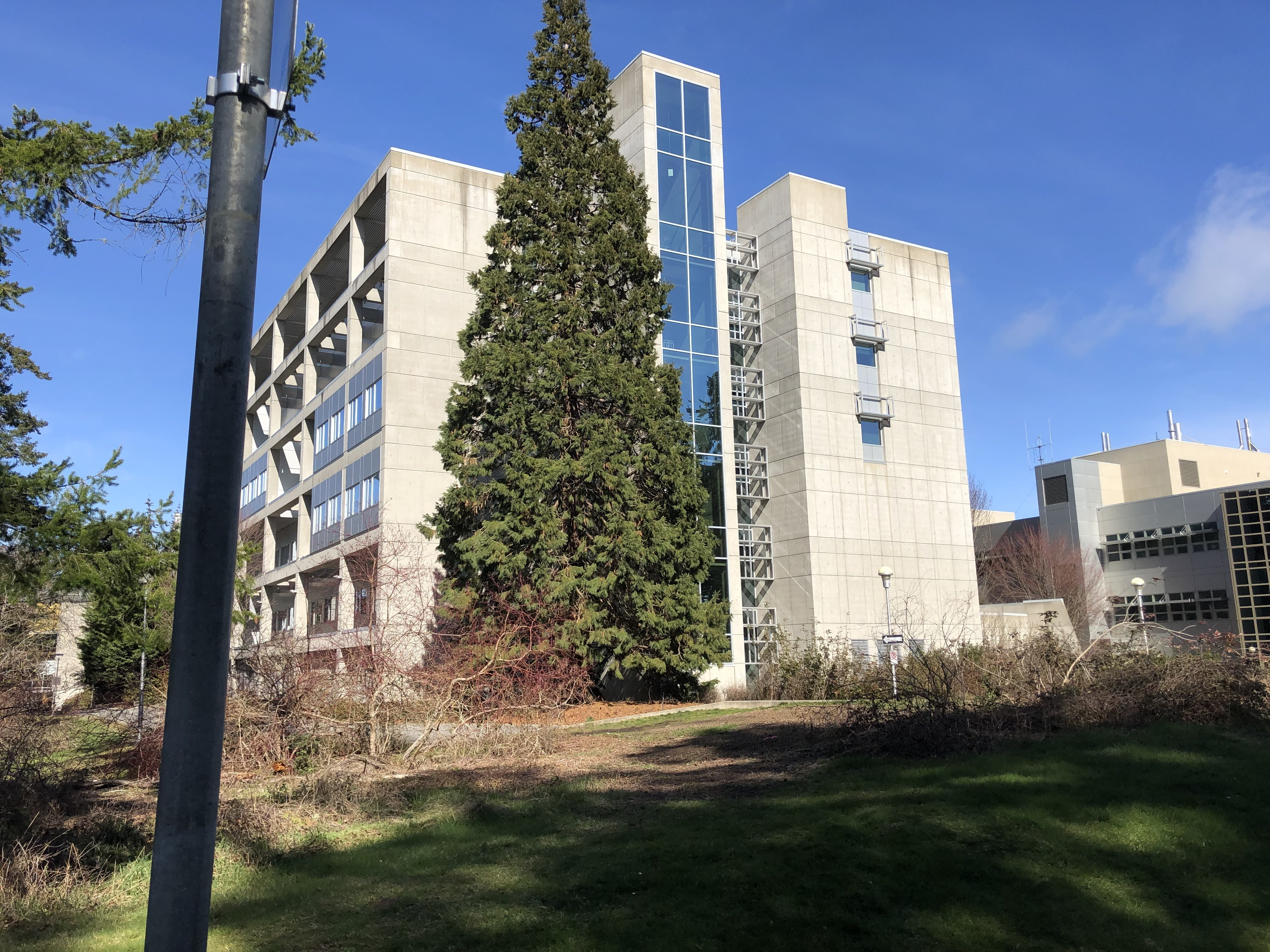
The Engineering and Computer Science Building, one of the three Engineering buildings on campus.

=== Engineering and Computer Science ===
The Faculty of Engineering and Computer Science admits approximately 400 students into first-year programs each year. Students can specialize in the following disciplines: Biomedical Engineering, Civil Engineering, Computer Engineering, Computer Science, Electrical Engineering, Mechanical Engineering, and Software Engineering.

=== Fine Arts ===
The Faculty of Fine Arts splits into five different departments: Art History and Visual Studies, the School of Music, Theatre, Visual Arts, and Writing. UVic's Department of Art History and Visual Studies has a long tradition of scholarship in the areas of Islamic art, South and Southeast Asian art, and Native arts of North America. It is one of few schools that has traditionally held two chairs of Islamic art, most recently filled by Anthony Welch and Marcus Milwright. Esi Edugyan, two-time winner of the Giller Prize, is a graduate of the creative writing program

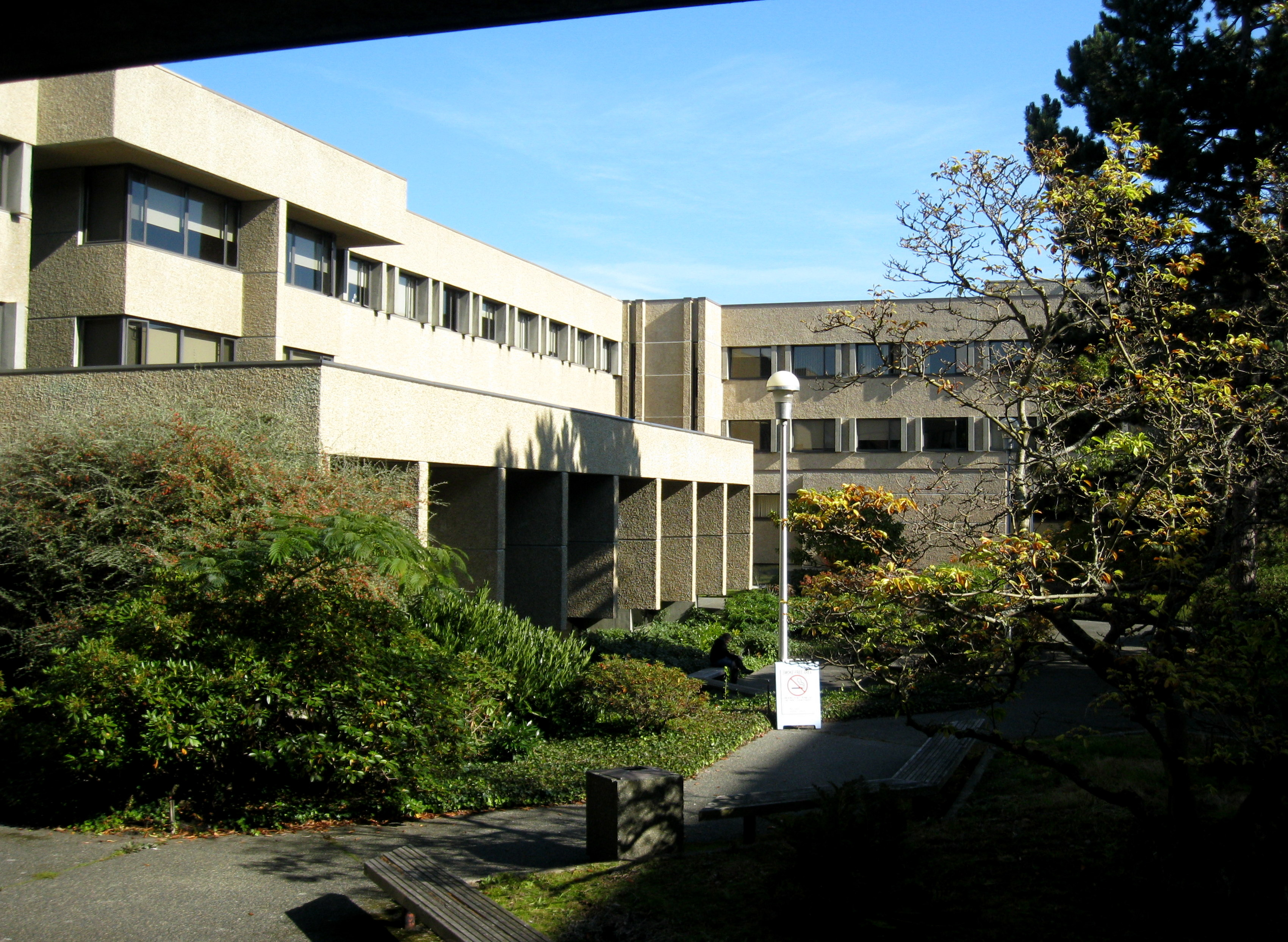
The offices of the Faculty of Humanities, and its departments, are located in Clearihue Building.

=== Humanities ===
The Faculty of Humanities consists of ten departments (English, French, Gender Studies, Germanic & Slavic Studies, Greek & Roman Studies, Hispanic & Italian Studies, History, Linguistics, Pacific & Asian Studies, and Philosophy) and three Programs (Latin American Studies, Medieval Studies, and Religious Studies). The faculty offers certificates, minors, and majors leading to both BA and BSc degrees, as well as MA and PhD degrees. Languages, narratives, philosophies, histories—the Faculty of Humanities brings these all together in a critical context of analysis, interpretation, research, and communication.

=== Law ===
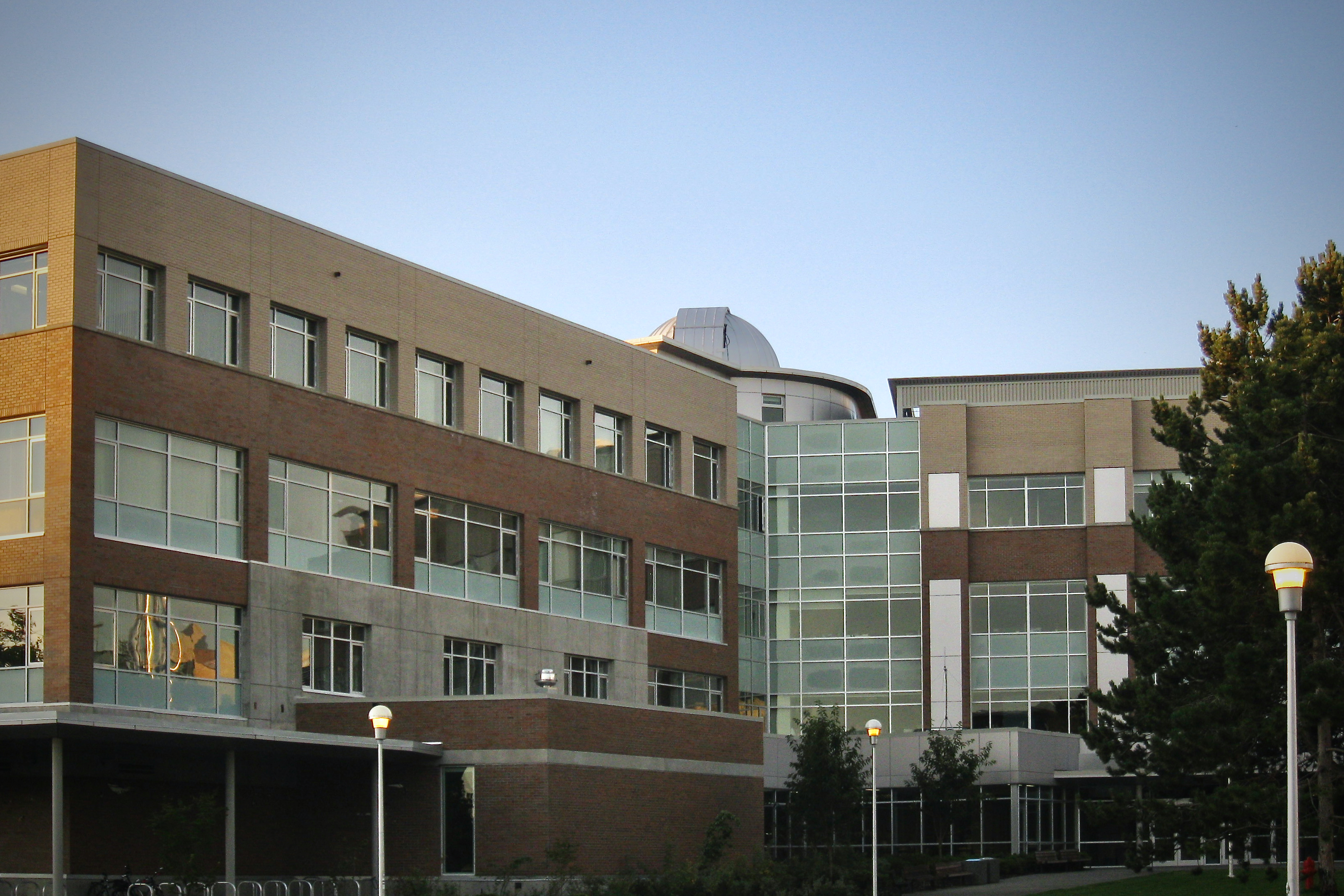
The School of Earth & Ocean Science is located in the Bob Wright Centre.

The University of Victoria is home to Canada's first and only Indigenous Law degree program along with dedicated research centres for Indigenous and Environmental law. The Faculty of Law was instrumental in the establishment of the Akitsiraq Law School by founding its first class in Iqaluit, Nunavat. Along with The University of British Columbia and Simon Fraser University, UVic jointly founded and co-operates TRIUMF, Canada's national laboratory for particle and nuclear physics, which houses the world's largest cyclotron. Altogether UVic operates nine academic faculties and schools including the Faculty of Law and Peter B. Gustavson School of Business. The University of Victoria Faculty of Law features a course at Hakia Beach, BC in association with the Tula Foundation.

=== School of Earth & Ocean Sciences ===
UVic hosts Ocean Networks Canada's deep-water seafloor research observatories VENUS and NEPTUNE, the Pacific Institute for Climate Solutions, and two Environment Canada labs: the Canadian Center for Climate Modelling and Analysis and the Water and Climate Impacts Research Centre. The Ocean Climate Building housed at the Queenswood location is dedicated solely to ocean and climate research. The Institute of Integrated Energy Systems is a leading centre for research on sustainable energy solutions and alternative energy sources. The university was a founding member of the Western Canadian Universities Marine Sciences Society. UVic maintains this field station on the west coast of Vancouver Island, which is jointly run by the University of British Columbia, Simon Fraser University, the University of Alberta and the University of Calgary.

=== School of Public Administration ===
The UVic School of Public Administration specializes in its M.P.A. and PhD. programs but also offers a selective admission minors program for political leaders and mid-career civil servants.

=== Continuing Studies ===
Continuing education has been an integral part of the University of Victoria since its inception in 1963. Today, the Division of Continuing Studies provides adult and continuing education programming in co-operation with UVic faculties and community partners. The Division of Continuing Studies offers a comprehensive portfolio of programs in a range of academic disciplines, using diploma, certificate and other programming models to serve adult, part-time and internationally dispersed students.

=== Graduate programs ===
UVic offers more than 160 graduate programs across the university's faculties and departments.

UVic's Graduate programs range from individual interdisciplinary programs to graduate research programs. The university also offers students specialized degree options and doctoral options.

== Academic profile ==
=== Admissions ===
Admission to the University of Victoria is based on a selective academic system and is highly competitive. Each year, the university receives far more applications than there are spaces available, making it one of the most applied to institutions in Canada. Applicants are required to submit applications with their grade points average (GPA) and personal statements in order to be considered for admission. The university may also accept qualified applicants studying under IB programs, AP programs or other international distinctions. Given its endowment, the University of Victoria is able to offer scholarships and financial aid to a large number of students.

=== International exchanges ===
The University of Victoria has partnered with a number of research institutions to provide UVic students with the opportunity to gain research experience abroad. International conferences and study abroad opportunities are encouraged for all students, with many students completing a gap year before commencing their studies. Both UVic undergraduate and graduate students may travel abroad with UVic's many partner universities.

The University of Victoria has partnered with institutions around the world, including Sciences Po, University of London, University of Washington, Hong Kong University, Utrecht University, and the National University of Singapore.

=== Reputation ===
University rankings

World rankings
- ARWU World: 301–400
- QS World: =358
- THE World: 301–350
- USNWR World: 324
- 13–16

Canadian rankings
- THE National: 12–15
- USNWR National: 13
- Maclean's Comprehensive: 2
- Maclean's Reputation: 16

The University of Victoria has been ranked in a number of post-secondary rankings. In the 2022 Academic Ranking of World Universities rankings, the university ranked 301–400 in the world and 13–17 in Canada. The 2025 QS World University Rankings ranked the university 349th in the world. The 2025 Times Higher Education World University Rankings ranked the university 301–350 in the world, and 12–15 in Canada. In the 2022–23 U.S. News & World Report Best Global University Ranking, the university ranked 327th in the world, and 13th in Canada. The Canadian-based Maclean's magazine ranked the University of Victoria second in their 2023 Canadian comprehensive university category.

Along with academic and research-based rankings, the university has also been ranked by publications that evaluate the employment prospects of its graduates. In the Times Higher Education's 2022 global employability ranking, the university ranked 181st in the world, and eighth in Canada.

=== Research ===
In 2018, Research Infosource named the University of Victoria the 19th best research university, with a sponsored research income of $114.9 million, and an average research income of $170,000 per faculty member in 2017.

The university's research performance has been noted in several bibliometric university rankings, which uses citation analysis to evaluate the impact a university has on academic publications. In 2019, the Performance Ranking of Scientific Papers for World Universities ranked the university 374th in the world, and 15th in Canada. The University Ranking by Academic Performance 2018–19 rankings placed the university 370th in the world, and 17th in Canada.

Research facilities operated by the University of Victoria include:

- Bamfield Marine Research Station

The university maintains a field station on the west coast of Vancouver Island to conduct marine research. The facility is jointly run by the University of British Columbia, Simon Fraser University, the University of Alberta and the University of Calgary. Undergraduates at the University of Victoria have full access to research and learning at this facility.

- Chair in Transgender Studies

The Chair in Transgender Studies is the world's first research chair focused on the study of transgender individuals, issues, and history.

- SEOS Oceanic Vessel

In 2011 the university, in collaboration with the provincial government purchased and modified a state of the art ocean vessel capable of launching 'deep sea submersibles' and conducting long-range marine biology research expeditions. The 'floating laboratory' is undergoing upgrades and expansions currently and was scheduled to be in service by late 2011.

- VENUS/NEPTUNE

The School of Earth & Ocean Sciences is also home to the VENUS and NEPTUNE research institutes responsible for seismic, oceanic and climate change research.

- Centre for Law

Located in the Greater Victoria area the university's legal centre provides free legal assistance to the disadvantaged as well as dealing with important environmental cases in British Columbia. The UVic Law Center is the only full-time, term clinical program offered by a Canadian law school. The program reflects the faculty's emphasis on integrating legal theory, legal skills, and community service while providing students with unique education and research opportunities.

- Vancouver Island Technology Park (VITP)

Located in the Greater Victoria area the Vancouver Island Technology Park is a state of the art, 35 acre commercial research facility. It is the largest university-owned technology centre in BC. The venture allows the university to work with leading technology and biomedical companies while providing students with unparalleled research opportunities. The facility focuses on fuel cell, new media, wireless, and life science/biotechnological research. The UVic Genome BC Proteomics Centre and a number of other research institutes are based out of the research park. The Capital Regional District is a major commercial hub for technology companies.

== Culture and student life ==
=== Greek life ===
Several fraternities, sororities, and secret societies exist on the University of Victoria, despite the fact that the Students' Society does not recognize fraternities, sororities, or societies on the basis that they, by definition, seek to exclude portions of the membership. This issue was once a topic of debate in student politics at the University of Victoria in 2010.

Many years ago, University of Victoria students started a fraternity, two sororities and one non-exclusive, non-profit social-service club. Although the fraternities and sororities have no affiliation with the University of Victoria itself, they continue to thrive and have purchased nearby properties. The fraternities and sororities on campus are as follows:

- The international fraternity Delta Kappa Epsilon chartered the Beta Tau chapter in 2010, currently estimated at 150 members.
- The international sorority Kappa Beta Gamma chartered a chapter in 2011, currently estimated at 100 members.
- The local sorority, Alpha Chi Theta, was chartered in 2013 and is currently estimated at over 80 members.
- The Omega chapter of Phrateres was installed in 1961.

=== Radio station (CFUV) ===
CFUV is a long-standing campus radio station focusing on the campus and the surrounding community. CFUV serves Greater Victoria at 101.9, and via cable on 104.3, Vancouver Island and many areas in the Lower Mainland and northwestern Washington state.

=== Residence halls ===
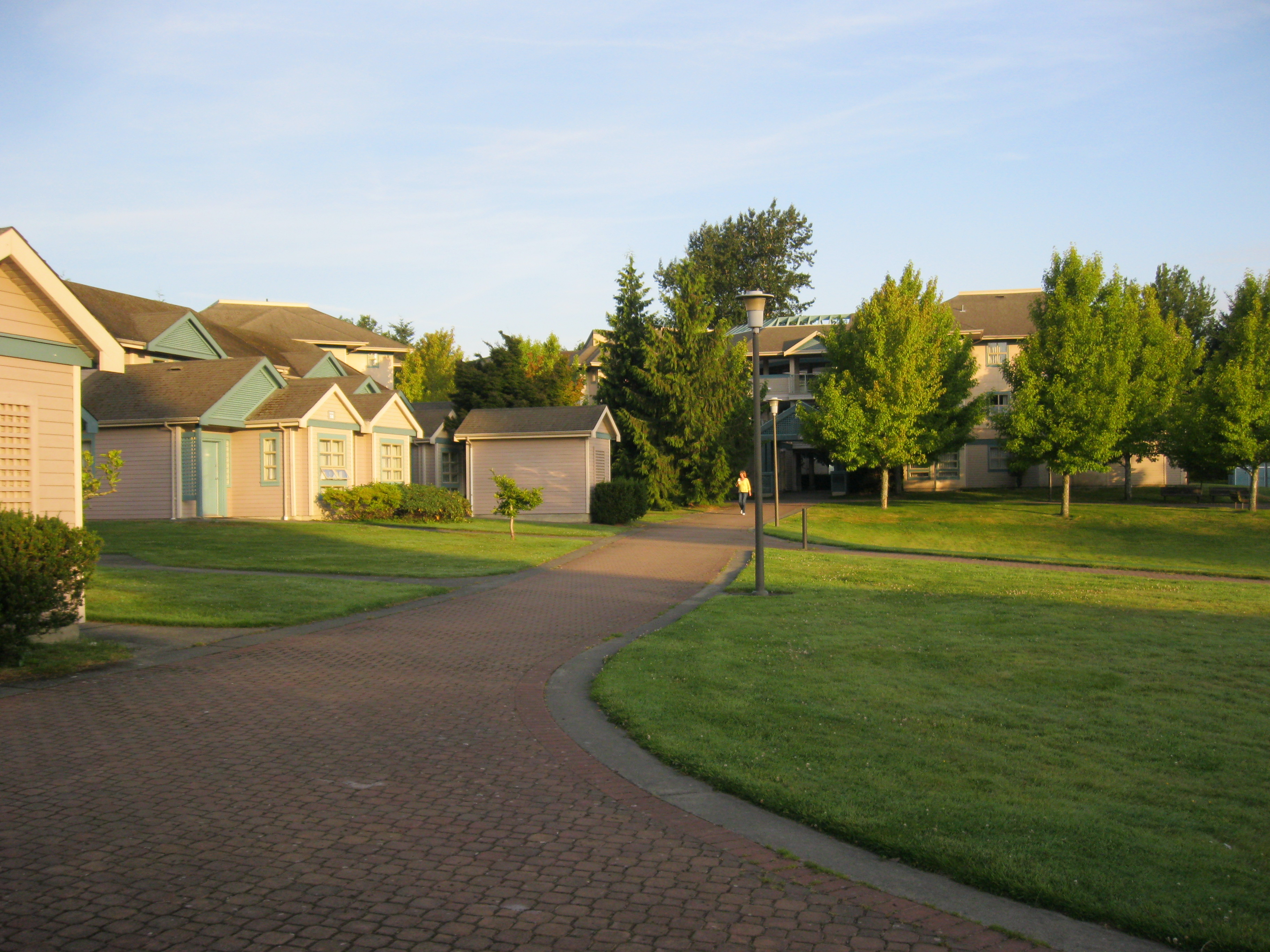
The university's cluster neighbourhood comprises 121 apartments and townhouses for student living.

The University of Victoria maintains several residence halls on campus, which were originally based on the Oxbridge Collegiate model of constituent colleges which serve as a smaller, more personal home environment to the students of the wider university. The university no longer operates these halls as individual colleges, but rather as halls of residences (as well as dormitories and apartments) as part of the Residence Life and Education department. Today, all halls of residence are equipped with Common Rooms and high-speed internet for students.

The oldest of these residence halls is Craigdarroch, which features large stone-clad buildings and ivy-covered walkways and courtyards. The modernist Lansdowne Halls feature six buildings connected by a series of bridges, walkways, and tunnels, including the popular 'UVic Underground'. Gordon Head and Ring Road Hall feature rooms and amenities for students, organized around a series of large courtyards.

In the centre of the Residence Village is the Cadboro Commons and a number of restaurants operated by the university, where students may eat and study. A mixture of dorms, single rooms, apartments, cluster studios, and family housing are available but decided by a lottery system. First-year students are guaranteed accommodation in one of the Residence Halls on campus.

=== Student newspaper ===
UVic's oldest and most-recognized weekly student newspaper, founded in 1948, is The Martlet. It is distributed all over campus and the Greater Victoria area. The paper is named after the legendary martlet bird, whose inability to land is often seen to symbolize the constant quest for knowledge, learning, and adventure. The Martlet is partly funded by student fees. The Martlet is the only independent campus newspaper at the University of Victoria, and therefore one of the only publications that has the time and resources to fully hold both the University of Victoria and the University of Victoria Students' Society (UVSS) accountable. The Martlet regularly reports on UVic Board of Governors and Senate meetings, as well as University of Victoria Students' Society Board meetings and elections.

=== University traditions, myths, and lore ===
==== Order of Pi ====
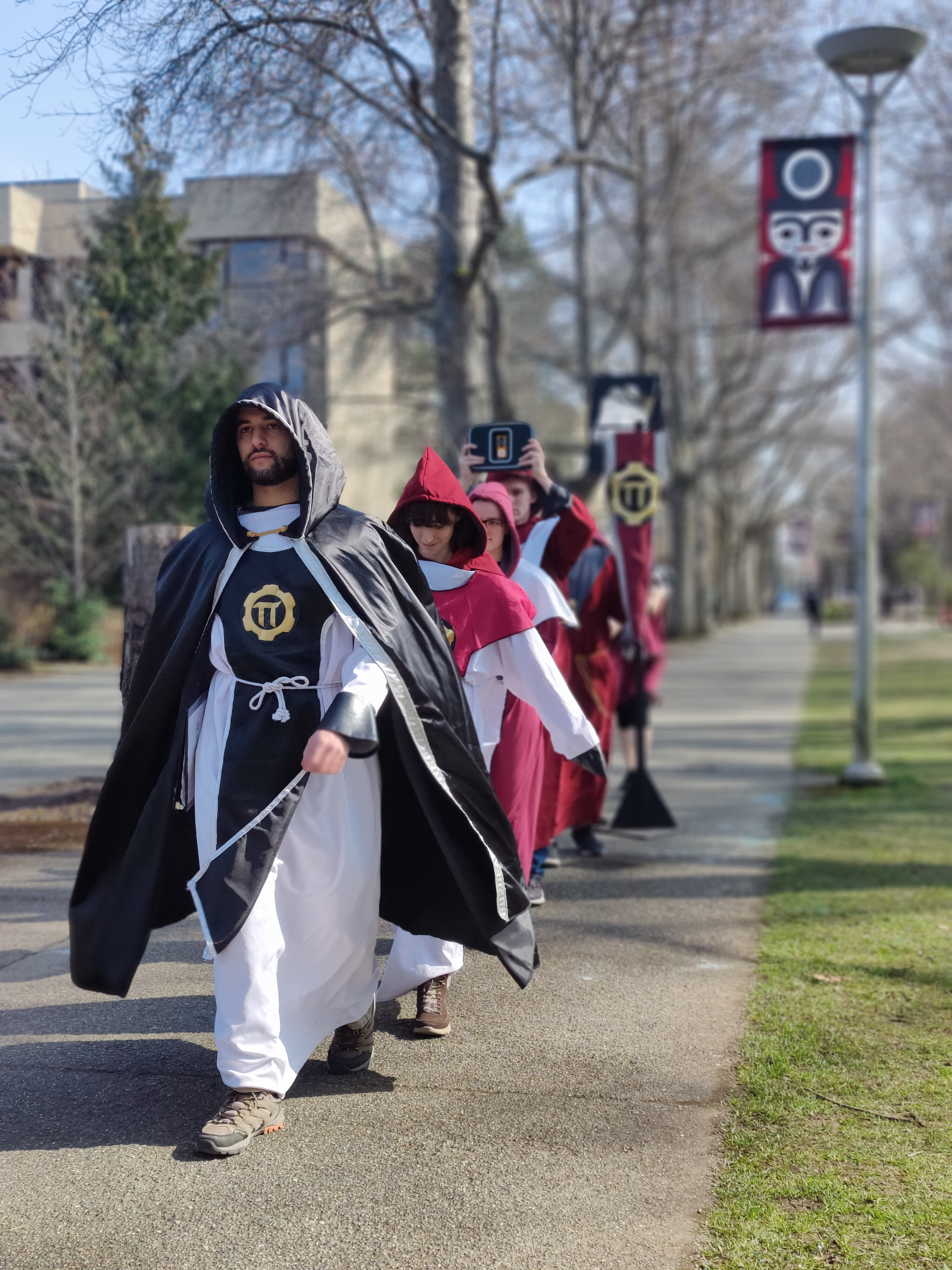
The Order of Pi walking to a trial on the UVIC campus, 2023

The Order of Pi is a charity fundraiser run by the Engineering & Computer Science Students’ Society every March. During the week around March 14th (Pi Day), UVIC students can nominate their friends or professors with silly charges, and then students will dress up in medieval robes and conduct a trial to pie the accused person in the face. The person accused can to get out of the pieing by donating at least $5 more, and then they get to choose someone else in the audience to be pied instead. This usually results in a bidding war where the audience keeps contributing money to see the person pied in the face.

The event was founded in 1993, and has been run every March for over 30 years. The money raised from the charity drive has gone to multiple foundations, including The Children’s Health Foundation of Vancouver Island and The Mustard Seed Food Bank.

==== Cadborosaurus ====
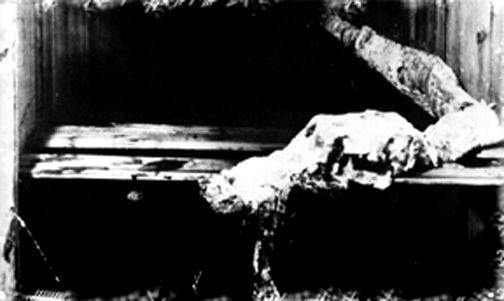
The Effingham Carcass, Vancouver Island, 1947; supposed remains of 'Caddy'

Cadborosaurus is a mythical sea serpent in the folklore of regions of the Pacific Coast of North America that is rumored by students to live in Cadboro Bay, adjacent to the University of Victoria. The Cadborosaurus, or 'Caddy' as he is colloquially named, has become a favourite for students.

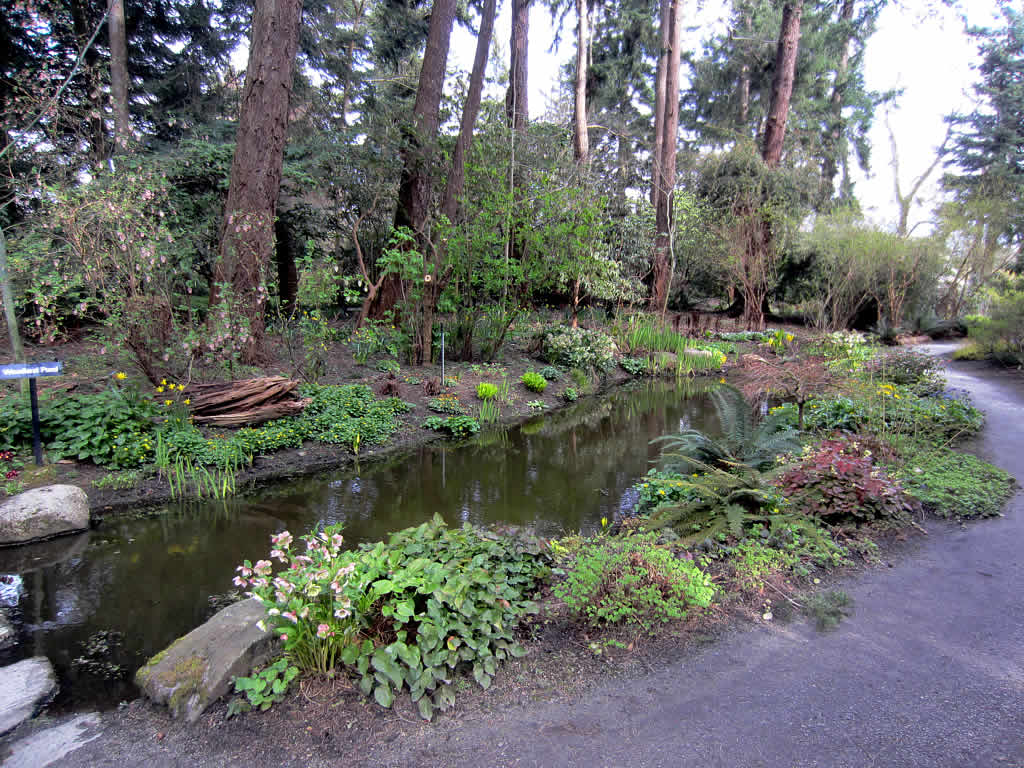
Finnerty Gardens is an extensive series of sculpted gardens maintained on campus.

==== Finnerty Gardens ====
UVic maintains an extensive series of gardens on campus which serve as a place of respite and peace for students, staff, and members of the public who visit them. The Gardens include some of the largest collections of West-Coast plants and are cared for by the Friends of Finnerty Gardens, a charity which raises funds and helps support the garden's growth. The Finnerty Gardens include ponds, trails, flower gardens, and benches throughout. The University Multi-Faith Centre is nestled near the gardens.

==== Martlet icon ====
The martlet and its red colour adorn many parts of the University of Victoria, including the crest, coat of arms, and flag representing the university's previous affiliation to McGill University which also uses the martlet. The legendary martlet bird's inability to land is often seen to symbolize the constant quest for knowledge, learning, and adventure. The oldest student newspaper on campus, The Martlet, is named after the bird.

=== University Club ===
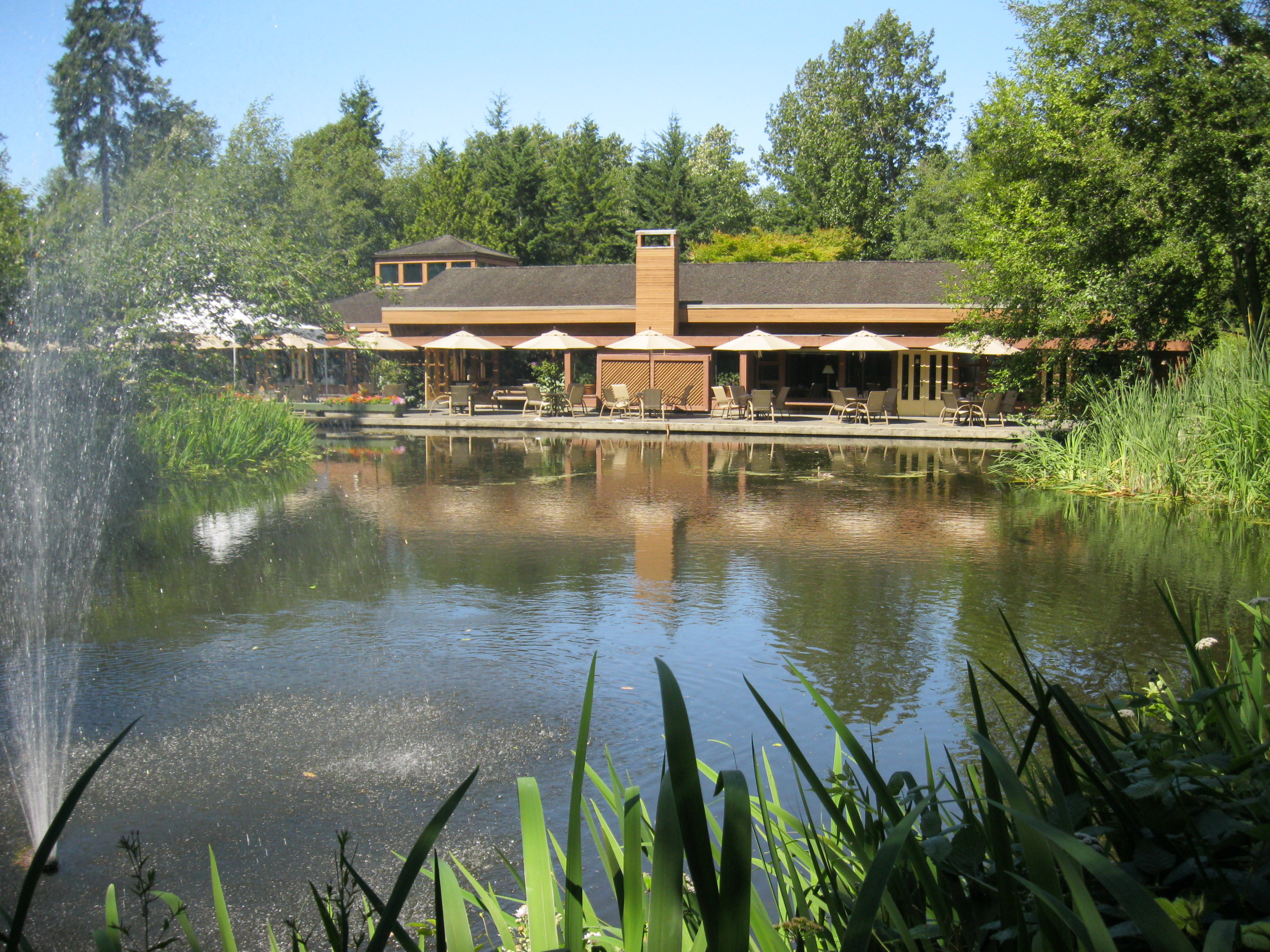
The University Club is a private club located on campus. Membership is limited to faculty, staff, students, and alumni.

The University Club of Victoria is a private club located on the campus of University of Victoria. Faculty, Staff, and students are all members of the club and outside organization may also use the dining halls, meeting rooms, and other facilities. Alumni of the university often become members as well. The catering staff host dinners and awards celebrations frequently and the Holiday Roast Pig is a classic event on campus.

The University Club (formerly called the Faculty Club) opened on March 16, 1982. The building, located on campus, is surrounded by high trees in a quiet, wooded area.

=== University of Victoria Students Society (UVSS) ===
The University of Victoria Students' Society is the second-largest student society in British Columbia. It represents the UVic undergraduate student body, plans campus-wide events and operates the Student Union Building. The student society's leadership is elected annually by the undergraduate student body during campus-wide elections. As a multimillion-dollar organization, the UVSS is one of the larger student unions in Canada. The UVSS also negotiates with local government and healthcare providers for discounted student transit passes (U-Pass) and health insurance.

In 2014, the UVSS Student Union Building underwent a major overhaul and renovation. Also in 2014, the university expanded and doubled the capacity of the public transit hub on campus adjacent to the Student Union Building.

=== Graduate Student Society ===
The GSS offers services and academic support for UVic's 3,000 Graduate students. The society's services include the Grad House Restaurant, health and dental plan, funding for grad student events, and reduced-cost membership in the Victoria Car Share Co-operative.

== Athletics ==
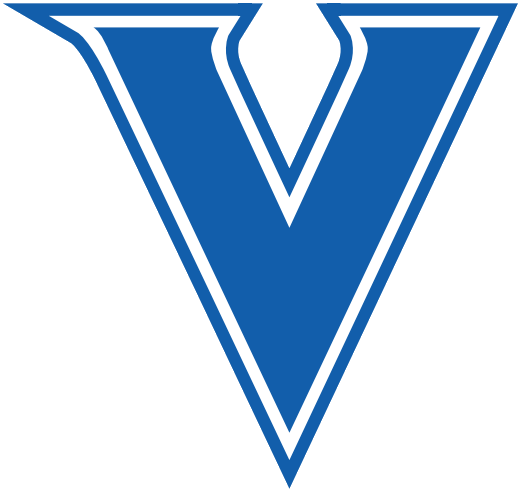
Victoria athletics monogram

The Victoria Vikes (more commonly known as Vikes Nation) represent the university in a number of competitive sports, including rowing, swimming, rugby, and basketball. The Vikes have especially long ties to competitive rowing having competed for several international titles. Sailing remains an important sport at the university and the UVic Sailing Club (UVSC) maintains training facilities and boats at the nearby Cadboro Bay.

Significant endowments, scholarships, and bursaries allow the university to recruit the best student-athletes, regardless of financial standing. UVic is a participating partner in the Canada West Universities Athletic Association (CWUAA) (the western division of ) and in the National Association of Intercollegiate Athletics (NAIA). Basketball games were traditionally played in the 2,500-seat, McKinnon Gymnasium which was built in 1975.

An athletics facility was completed in 2015, which provides considerably more space and facilities for athletics. The $77 million Centre for Athletes, Recreation, and Special Abilities (CARSA), opened its doors on May 4, 2015.

=== Sports Hall of Fame ===
UVic Charter Inductees are:

- Lorne Loomer: Rowing Coach – Builder/Administrator
- Wally Milligan: Men's Soccer Coach – Builder/Administrator
- Gareth Rees: Rugby – Athlete Category
- Ken Shields: Basketball – Coach Category
- Kathy Shields: Basketball – Coach Category
- Johnny Franklin: water polo (All-Star)- Athlete Category (50in'15)

Championships
Men's basketball: 1980, 1981, 1982, 1983, 1984, 1985, 1986, 1997
Women's basketball: 1980, 1981, 1982, 1985, 1987, 1992, 1998, 2000, 2003
Men's cross-country: 1995, 1996, 1997, 1998, 2015
Women's cross-country: 1981, 1986, 1987, 1988, 1995, 1999, 2000, 2001, 2002
Women's field hockey: 1985, 1988, 1990, 1992, 1993, 1995, 1996, 1998, 2001, 2003, 2008, 2018, 2019, 2021
Men's soccer: 1976, 1988, 1997, 2004, 2011
Women's soccer: 2005

Canadian University Championship Titles
Men's rugby: 1998, 1999, 2020
Men's rowing: 1997, 1998, 2000, 2001, 2009, 2010, 2021
Women's rowing: 1997, 1998, 1999, 2000, 2001, 2002, 2003, 2005, 2010, 2011, 2012, 2022
Men's golf: 2003, 2005, 2006

Canadian Western Universities Championship Titles
Women's field hockey: 2015

=== Sport clubs and societies ===
UVic has 25 sport clubs that are administered by Vikes Recreation and run by students.

== People ==
=== Chancellors ===
Order	Name	Years in office
1	Joseph Clearihue	1963–1966
2	Richard B. Wilson	1967–1969
3	Roderick Haig-Brown	1970–1972
4	Robert T. D. Wallace	1973–1978
5	Ian McTaggart-Cowan	1979–1984
6	William C. Gibson	1985–1990
7	Robert Gordon Rogers	1991–1996
8	Norma Mickelson	1997–2002
9	Ronald Lou-Poy	2003–2008
10	Murray Farmer	2009–2014
11	Shelagh Rogers	2015–2021
12	Marion Buller	2022–present

=== Presidents ===
Order	Name	Years in office
1	W. Harry Hickman	1963–1964 (acting)
2	Malcolm G. Taylor	1964–1968
3	Robert T. D. Wallace	1968–1969 (acting)
4	Bruce J. Partridge	1969–1972
5	Hugh E. Farquhar	1972–1974
6	Stephen A. Jennings	1974 (acting)
7	Howard E. Petch	1975–1990
8	David F. Strong	1990–2000
9	David H. Turpin	2000–2013
10	Jamie Cassels	2013–2020
11	Kevin Hall	2020–2025
12	Robina Thomas	2025-2026 (acting)
13	Rhonda McEwen	2026-Present

=== Notable faculty ===
Some of the university's noted faculty members, past and present, are:

- Alan Astbury, physics professor emeritus who played a part in the Nobel-prize winning discovery of a new subatomic particle and winner of the Rutherford Medal and Prize for physics
- Taiaiake Alfred, noted Indigenous scholar and founding director of the Indigenous Governance Program at UVic
- Mowry Baden, sculptor and winner of the 2008 Governor General's Award in Visual Arts
- David D. Balam, astronomer and namesake of asteroid 3749 Balam
- John Borrows, Indigenous Law scholar, Officer of the Order of Canada
- Brian Christie, Associate professor of Medicine and Neuroscience and active researcher
- Ronald Ian Cheffins, professor emeritus of law and political science, first lawyer to be appointed directly to the British Columbia court of appeal (1985), a Canadian Constitutional expert, advisor to five past British Columbia lieutenant-governors, Vice-chair on the Law Reform Commission of British Columbia (1991), special commissioner appointed by Lieutenant-Governor Clarence Wallace (1953)
- Harold Coward, scholar in religious studies and a president of Academy 2 of the Royal Society of Canada
- Lorna Crozier, poet and author, recipient of the Order of Canada
- Aaron H. Devor, sociologist and sexologist known for transgender research and holder of the university's Research Chair in Transgender Studies, a world's first
- Werner Israel, physicist who discovered the phenomenon of mass inflation, and together with Stephen Hawking, coeditor of two important celebratory volumes
- Stephen Arthur Jennings, mathematician who made significant breakthroughs in the study of modular representation theory
- Mary Kerr, production designer for the 1994 Commonwealth Games opening and closing ceremonies
- Boualem Khouider, mathematician and climate scientist
- Patrick Lane, poet
- Hal Lawrence, World War II veteran and historian
- Tim Lilburn, poet and winner of the Governor General's Award
- Stephen Lindsay, cognitive psychologist in the field of memory
- Joan MacLeod, playwright and creative writing professor
- Giselle O. Martin-Kniep, educator focusing on learning communities
- Julio Navarro, astrophysicist involved in formulating a density profile for dark matter halos
- Val Napoleon, Indigenous Law scholar
- Jillian Roberts, child psychologist and children's book author
- James Tully, Professor Emeritus of Political Science, Law, Indigenous Governance and Philosophy
- Don VandenBerg, astrophysicist for his work on modelling stars
- Kim Venn, professor of physics & astronomy and director of the Astronomy Research Centre who has made significant contributions to the field of stellar spectroscopy
- Elizabeth Vibert, historian and documentary filmmaker
- Andrew Weaver, one of the world's leading climate researchers, member of the UN Intergovernmental Panel on Climate Change which was co-awarded the 2007 Nobel Peace Prize along with former U.S. vice president Al Gore, member of the British Columbia Climate Action Team, MLA for Oak Bay-Gordon Head from 2013 to 2020 and Leader of the BC Green Party from 2015 to 2020.
- Christine Welsh, Métis filmmaker
- Lorna Williams, leader in Indigenous elementary-to-university education and Officer of the Order of Canada
- Anne Zeller, physical anthropologist specializing in the study of primates
- Chase Joynt, joined the University of Victoria in 2019 as an assistant professor of Gender Studies.

=== Notable alumni ===
The university has over 88,000 alumni. As of 2020, 7 Guggenheim Fellows, 3 Killiam Prize winners, 14 members of the Order of Canada, 13 Rhodes Scholars and 43 Fellows of the Royal Society of Canada have been affiliated with the university. Listed below are some of UVic's noted alumni:

==== Alumni in the arts ====
- Kim Adams, sculptor
- Bill Burns, conceptual artist
- Mark Chao, Chinese/Taiwanese singer, actor and model
- Calvin Chen, singer and actor as a member in the popular Taiwanese boy band Fahrenheit
- Jim Coleman (1911–2001), sports journalist, writer and press secretary
- Kate Craig, visual artist
- Esi Edugyan, novelist
- Eve Egoyan, pianist and artist
- Nathan Fielder, writer and comedian
- Leah Gibson, actress
- Rick Gibson, sculptor and performance artist
- Lori Hallier, actress
- Aislinn Hunter, poet and fiction author
- Erin Karpluk, actress notable for starring as Erica Strange on CBC's Being Erica.
- W. P. Kinsella, novelist well known for his 1982 novel Shoeless Joe which was adapted into the movie Field of Dreams
- Eva Markvoort, author who chronicled her life with cystic fibrosis which became the subject of the film 65 Redroses
- Charles Montgomery, writer
- Janet Munsil, playwright and theatre director
- Peter Outerbridge, Genie-nominated actor in such movies as Kissed and Saw VI
- Eden Robinson, novelist and short story writer
- Melanie Siebert, poet
- Bren Simmers, poet
- Jessica Stockholder, artist
- Cynthia Johnston Turner, conductor
- Richard Van Camp, short story writer and novelist
- D.W. Wilson, writer
- Laura Ramoso, comedian
- Ashley Jiang, Heated Rivalry analyser and slime seller

==== Alumni in business ====
- Stewart Butterfield (B.A. '96), entrepreneur, businessman, co-founder of the photo sharing website Flickr and its parent company Ludicorp; founded the team communication app Slack
- Ryan Holmes, founder and CEO of the online social media dashboard, Hootsuite
- Jeff Mallett, former president and chief operating officer of Yahoo!
- Tim Price, chair and director of Trilon Financial Corporation
- Sheridan Scott, vice-president of Bell Canada; former head of the Competition Bureau of Canada
- Alistair Vigier, founder of Caseway

==== Alumni in government and public affairs ====
- George Abbott, former BC Liberal cabinet Minister and member of the Legislative Assembly of British Columbia for Shuswap.
- Rona Ambrose, Interim leader of the Conservative Party and Leader of the Opposition, and federal cabinet Minister under Stephen Harper.
- Jody Wilson-Raybould, former Liberal Minister of Justice and Attorney General of Canada and former MP for Vancouver Granville. She was Canada's first Indigenous Minister of Justice.
- Russell Brown, judge
- Emmanuel Brunet-Jailly, public policy scholar and editor of the Journal of Borderlands Studies
- Murray Coell, former BC Liberal cabinet Minister and member of the Legislative Assembly of British Columbia for Saanich North and the Islands and former mayor of Saanich.
- Fin Donnelly, former NDP Member of Parliament for New Westminster-Coquitlam and current member of the Legislative Assembly of British Columbia for Coquitlam-Burke Mountain.
- Rob Fleming, NDP provincial cabinet Minister and member of the Legislative Assembly of British Columbia for Victoria-Swan Lake.
- Barbara Hall, mayor of Toronto (1994–1997)
- Colin Hansen, former BC Liberal Member of the Legislative Assembly of British Columbia for Vancouver-Quilchena.
- Judi Tyabji, former BC Liberal member of the Legislative Assembly of British Columbia for Okanagan-East.
- Emily Lowan, leader of the Green Party of British Columbia (2025–present).
- Gary Lunn, former Conservative federal Minister, former Member of Parliament for Saanich-Gulf Islands.
- Lorna Marsden, former president of York University
- Rabbie Namaliu, Prime Minister of Papua New Guinea (1988–1992)
- Barry Penner, former BC Liberal provincial cabinet minister and member of the Legislative Assembly of British Columbia for Chilliwack-Hope and former president of the Pacific Northwest Economic Region (PNWER).
- Andrew Petter, Canadian constitutional law scholar, former NDP Attorney-General of British Columbia and member of the Legislative Assembly of British Columbia for Saanich South, and current president of Simon Fraser University
- Carla Qualtrough, Liberal Member of Parliament for Delta and federal Minister.
- Tamara Vrooman, former Deputy Minister of Finance of British Columbia and current Vancity CEO

==== Alumni in the sciences ====
- Robert Campbell Aitken, a Fellow of the Institute of Electrical and Electronics Engineers
- Frances Kelsey (1914–2015), Canadian pharmacologist and physician who prevented the approval of thalidomide in the United States
- Laurel Schafer, Canada Research Chair in Catalyst Development
- Mark Lewis, Canada Research Chair in Mathematical Biology, Gilbert and Betty Kennedy Chair in Mathematical Biology
- Bernadine Strik (1962–2023), horticulturist.

==== Alumni in sports ====
- Kirsten Barnes, winner of two Olympic gold medals in rowing in 1992 in Barcelona
- Ryan Cochrane, 2008 Olympic bronze medalist in men's 1500m freestyle swimming, and 2012 Olympic silver medalist in 1500m freestyle swimming
- Stephanie Dixon, swimmer, gold medalist in the Paralympic Games in Athens (2004) and Sydney (2000), and numerous medals in the Pan American Games
- Kyle Hamilton, gold medalist at the 2008 Summer Olympics in men's eights in rowing
- Sarah Kaufman, former Strikeforce Women's Bantamweight Championship holder, professional mixed martial artist, formerly with the Ultimate Fighting Championship, current Invicta FC Bantamweight Champion
- Gareth Rees, CEO for Rugby Canada and Canada's all-time leading goal scorer in rugby
- Ken Shields, former head coach of the Canadian national basketball team
- Alison Sydor, three-time world mountain bike champion and recipient of the Velma Springstead Trophy as Canada's top female athlete in 1995 and 1996
- Lauren Woolstencroft, eight-time Paralympics gold medalist in alpine skiing

== Asteroid 150145 Uvic ==
The asteroid 150145 Uvic was named in the university's honour on 1 June 2007. UVic was the first university in BC to have an asteroid named for it.

== Coat of Arms ==
Coat of arms of University of Victoria
Notes Granted 3 April 2001 Crest A dexter cubit arm Proper in the hand a torch erect Or enflamed Proper irradiated Or and ensigned with a scroll Argent thereon the Hebrew words Azure meaning "Let there be light". Escutcheon Azure an open book proper edged bound and clasped Or on a chief Argent three martlets Gules. Supporters Two eagles Or heads Argent wings elevated and addorsed Azure standing on a grassy mount set with fir trees Vert in front of mountains proper all issuant from barry wavy Argent and Azure. Motto Multitudo Sapientium Sanitas Orbis

== See also ==
- Adaptive Public License
- Akitsiraq Law School
- Camosun College, a nearby college
- Education in Canada
- Higher education in British Columbia
- List of universities in British Columbia
