= Rimhak Ree =

Korean Canadian mathematician (1922–2005)

- 이임학 (李林學)
- Born: 18 December 1922; Hamhung, Kankyōnan-dō, Korea, Empire of Japan
- Died: 9 January 2005 (aged 82); Vancouver, Canada
- Citizenship: Canadian
- Education: Keijō Imperial University; University of British Columbia
- Known for: Ree group
- Spouse: Rhoda Ree
- Awards: Korea Science & Technology Hall of Fame (2007)
- Scientific career
- Fields: Mathematics; Group Theory
- Workplaces: University of British Columbia
- Thesis: Witt Algebras (1955)
- Doctoral advisor: Stephen Arthur Jennings

Korean name
- Hangul: 이임학
- Hanja: 李林學
- RR: I Imhak
- MR: I Imhak

Rimhak Ree (Korean: 이임학; December 18, 1922 – January 9, 2005), alternatively Im-hak Ree, was a Korean Canadian mathematician. He contributed in the field of group theory, most notably with the concept of the Ree group in (Ree 1960, 1961).

== Early life ==
Ree received his early education in Hamhung, Kankyōnan-dō, Korea, Empire of Japan (now in North Korea). He attended the Hamhung #1 Public Ordinary School (함흥 제 1공립보통학교), and in 1934 entered the Hamhung Public High School (함흥공립고등보통학교). He went on to Keijō Imperial University, where he studied physics, which was an unusual choice for Koreans at the time. Ree graduated in 1944 with a physics degree; he then went to Fengtian, Manchukuo (today Shenyang, Liaoning in the People's Republic of China) to work for an aircraft company.

== Career ==
After the surrender of Japan in 1945 and the end of Japanese rule in Korea, Ree returned to his hometown of Hamhung and briefly took up a professorship at the invitation of the newly established Kim Il-sung University, but soon escaped to South Korea and was appointed as an assistant professor in the Department of Mathematics at Seoul National University in early 1947. Later that year, in Namdaemun Market, Ree found an issue of the Bulletin of the American Mathematical Society, which proposedly was left by an American soldier. On the Bulletin was the paper 'Note on power series', in which Max Zorn solved a problem about the convergence of certain power series with complex coefficients. In the paper, Zorn posed a question of whether the same result held for power series with real coefficients. Ree solved the problem and sent the solution to Max Zorn. When Zorn received Ree's solution, it was sent to the Bulletin of the American Mathematical Society to be published in 1949 with the title 'On a problem of Max Zorn' and become the first mathematical paper published by a Korean in an international journal.

At the beginning of the Korean War, he failed to evacuate and remained in North Korean-occupied Seoul, living in hiding to avoid conscription by the Korean People's Army. He fled south to Busan in 1951, after the Third Battle of Seoul took place.

In 1953 he was awarded a Canadian scholarship to allow him to study for a Ph.D. degree at the University of British Columbia in Vancouver, Canada. He completed his dissertation on Witt algebras in 1955. His thesis advisor was Stephen Arthur Jennings. Following the award of his doctorate, Ree was appointed as a lecturer at Montana State University, despite facing several problems regarding his labour permission and nationality.

In mid-1955, Ree received a grant from the National Research Council of Canada and he worked with Jennings on Lie algebras. In 1958, he published a solution to a problem of Paul Erdős regarding a certain class of irrational numbers. Ree's two most renowned papers were written from 1960 to 1961, in which he suggested a Lie type group over a finite field now named after him. In 1962 after being promoted to an assistant professor in mathematics at University of British Columbia, he was granted an academic year which he spent in Yale. He was elected a member of Royal Society of Canada in 1964.

== Personal life ==
Ree had two daughters Erran and Hiran from his first marriage. He later married Rhoda Mah, a doctor and the daughter of John Ming Mah, who owned Northwest Food Products, a manufacturers of noodles. She would go on to work as staff physician for Canadian Pacific Airlines. Rimhak and Rhoda's first son Ronald was followed by another son Robert in December 1971. They also had a third son Richard.

Around the time Ree received his doctorate, his passport was approaching its expiration date, so he visited the South Korean consulate in San Francisco to extend it, but instead the consular officer ordered him to return to South Korea. As he refused and his passport was revoked, Ree became de facto stateless. He later received permanent residency in Canada and continued to work at the University of British Columbia.

Ree's family was divided by the Korean War, with his father, older sister, and other relatives having stayed in their hometown of Hamhung. He reportedly visited North Korea using his Canadian passport various times for academic exchanges, but he was not able to travel freely in North Korea and thus had no success in making contact with his relatives. Ree requested help from Erdős, who as an internationally-famous Hungarian citizen faced fewer restrictions on travel or communication in either capitalist or communist countries. In the 1980s, Erdős was able to make contact with several relatives of Ree's with the help of Hungary's Ministry of Foreign Affairs and the country's embassy in Pyongyang, and sent Ree an envelope containing their letters, photographs, and addresses. Ree forwarded the envelope to his mother and younger sister in South Korea, which reportedly resulted in them being investigated by South Korea's intelligence services. Furthermore, his visits to North Korea led South Korea's Park Chung Hee government to place an entry ban on him. His entry ban was lifted in 1996, when he was invited to the 50th anniversary ceremony of the Korean Mathematical Society.

He suffered from Alzheimer's disease in his later years. Ree died on January 9, 2005, in Vancouver, Canada.

== Publications ==
- Ree, Rimhak (1960), "A family of simple groups associated with the simple Lie algebra of type (G_{2})", Bulletin of the American Mathematical Society, 66: 508–510, doi:10.1090/S0002-9904-1960-10523-X, ISSN 0002-9904, MR 0125155
- Ree, Rimhak (1961), "A family of simple groups associated with the simple Lie algebra of type (F_{4})", Bulletin of the American Mathematical Society, 67: 115–116, doi:10.1090/S0002-9904-1961-10527-2, ISSN 0002-9904, MR 0125155
