= Michio Suzuki =

Michio Suzuki may refer to:

- Michio Suzuki (inventor) (鈴木 道雄, 1887–1982), Japanese businessman, inventor and founder of the Suzuki Motor Corporation
- Michio Suzuki (mathematician) (鈴木 通夫, 1926–1998), Japanese mathematician
