= Cadboro =

Cadboro may refer to:

- Cadboro (schooner), an 1826 vessel in the employ of the Hudson's Bay Company in the 19th Century Pacific Northwest
- Cadboro Bay, British Columbia, a bay on Vancouver Island and a community named for the vessel
- Cadborosaurus, a sea monster named for Cadboro Bay, where it has often been sighted
