= Ten Mile Point, British Columbia =

Coordinates: 48.4566°N 123.2784°W

Ten Mile Point is a neighbourhood in the District of Saanich in Victoria, British Columbia, and is the most easterly point on Vancouver Island. Ten Mile Point was so named because it was ten nautical miles (18.5 km (11.5 mi)) from what was at the time the headquarters of the Pacific Station of the Royal Navy (now CFB Esquimalt). Ten Mile Point is a wooded peninsula that forms one side of Cadboro Bay, the home of the Royal Victoria Yacht Club and the mythical Cadborosaurus sea monster. Cadboro Point is located on the east part of this peninsula. Prevost Hill was named after James Charles Prevost, British commissioner in the negotiations to settle the San Juan boundary dispute. Prevost Hill is the highest elevation on Ten Mile Point and is known informally in the neighbourhood as "Minnie Mountain". Prevost Hill is the location for a subdivision within Ten Mile Point called "Wedgewood Point" or "Wedgewood Estates". A small wooded island, "Flower Island", almost touches the southern shore of Ten Mile Point. Ten Mile Point has many secluded beaches and coves.

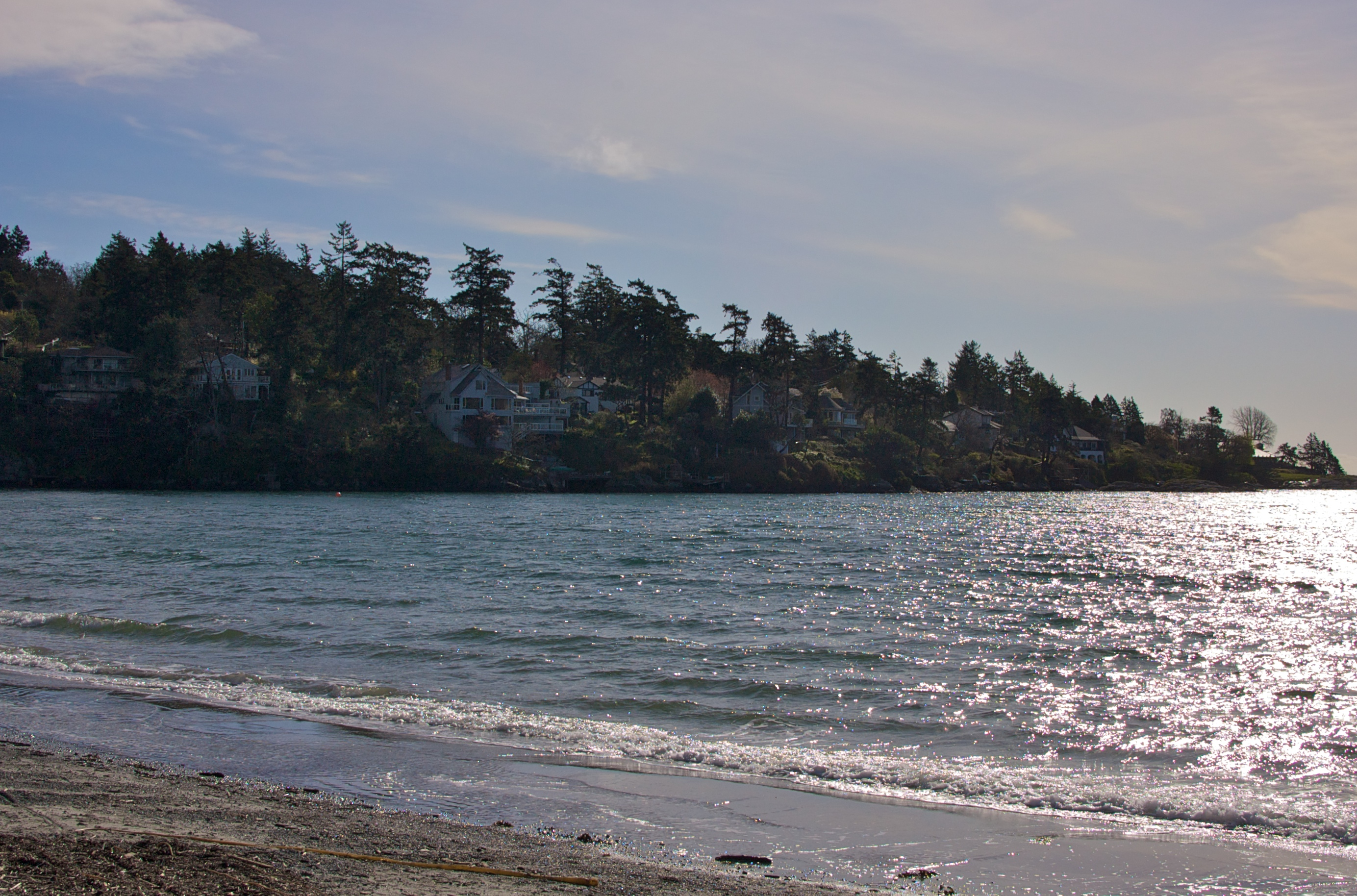
Ten Mile Point, as seen from the beach on Cadboro Bay

One such cove, called "Smuggler's Cove", was used during the prohibition years as a boat landing and launch for rum-runners traveling back and forth to the United States.

Another cove is called "Telegraph Cove" and was the location of a dynamite factory which operated in the late 19th century.

In the early part of the 20th century, Ten Mile Point became a summer retreat with many cabins on its shores. It gradually developed into the present upscale residential neighbourhood.

Ten Mile Point maintains a rural, bucolic feel as a result of 1-acre (4,000 m^{2}) lot municipal zoning implemented specifically for this area by the District of Saanich. The area has only two street lamps.

Retired two-time NBA MVP Steve Nash and singer/songwriter Nelly Furtado both own homes in Ten Mile Point. The neighbourhood was also home to movie director George Pan Cosmatos.

Canadian musician Ten Mile Point is named after the neighbourhood.

Ten Mile Point was the filming location for the fictional Washington State community of "Fisher Island" in the 2021 Netflix series, "Maid".
