= John Charles Olmsted =

American landscape architect

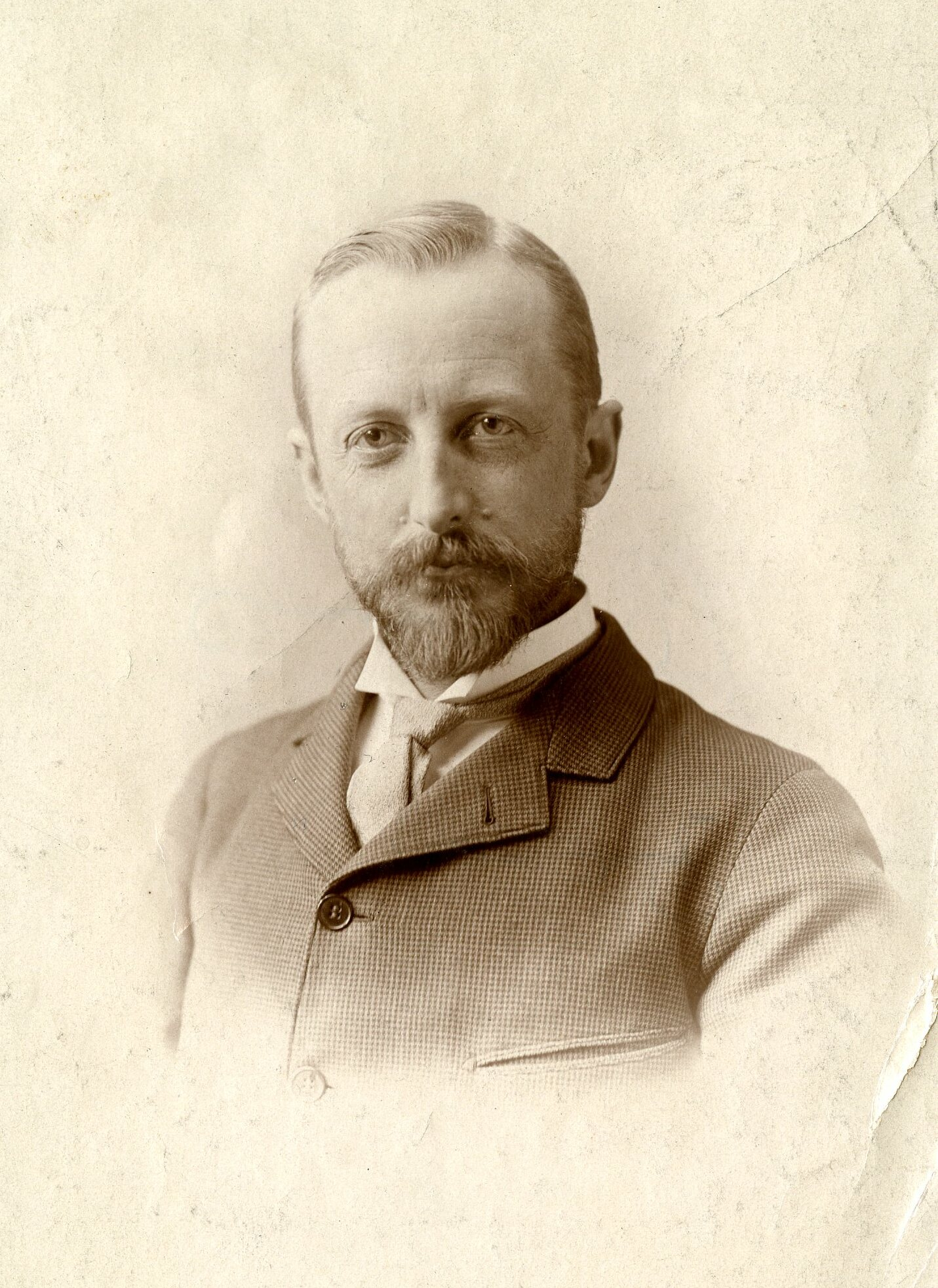
- Born: September 14, 1852; Geneva, Switzerland
- Died: February 24, 1920 (aged 67); Brookline, Massachusetts
- Occupation: Architect
- Practice: Olmsted Brothers
- Design: Tappan Square; Yerkes Observatory; Grant Park; Washington Park; Druid Hills; Oregon State University; Uplands
- Burial place: Walnut Hills Cemetery
- Relatives: Frederick Law Olmsted (uncle); Frederick Law Olmsted Jr. (cousin and half-brother)

1st President of the American Society of Landscape Architects
- In office 1899–1901
- Succeeded by: Samuel Parsons

John Charles Olmsted (September 14, 1852 – February 24, 1920) was an American landscape architect. The nephew and adopted son of Frederick Law Olmsted, he worked with his father and his younger half-brother, Frederick Law Olmsted Jr., in their father's firm. After their father retired, the brothers took over leadership and founded Olmsted Brothers as a landscape design firm. The firm became well known for designing many urban parks, college campuses, and other public places. John Olmsted's body of work from over 40 years as a landscape architect has left its mark on the American urban landscape.

== Early life ==
John Charles Olmsted was born in Geneva, Switzerland, in 1852 to John Olmsted and Mary Cleveland (Perkins) Olmsted. His father, John, had contracted tuberculosis, which at the time had no adequate treatment. Fresh air and healthy living, including exercise, were recommended. Some sanatoriums were established in mountain areas.

The John Olmsted family returned to the United States to reside at Tosomock Farm on Staten Island in New York. After his father died, his mother remarried, to John's brother, Frederick Law Olmsted. Frederick adopted John as his son. Later he and Mary had children of their own, including Frederick Law Olmsted Jr., born in 1870.

== Career ==
John Olmsted began his career at his father's firm, where he was later joined by his younger half-brother Frederick. After their father retired, the two took over leadership, establishing the firm as Olmsted Brothers, although Frederick was the "driving force" in the company. They each contracted separately for some projects.

Olmsted expressed his design philosophy of integrated park systems into planning projects in such cities as Portland, Maine; Portland, Oregon; Seattle and Spokane, Washington; Dayton, Ohio, and Charleston, South Carolina. In these cities, he pioneered his comprehensive planning philosophy of integrating civic buildings, roads, parks, and greenspaces into livable urban areas.

Olmsted also designed individual parks in New Orleans; Watertown, New York; and Chicago, Illinois. His work in park design led to commissions for numerous institutions such as school campuses, civic buildings, and state capitals, as well as designs for large residential areas, including roads and schools. His work in comprehensive planning for the communities surrounding industrial plants and factories is considered especially noteworthy.

In all his work, John Olmsted retained a sensitivity to the natural beauty of the site, including its views, vistas, and greenways. He wanted to ensure that communities and public areas must be comfortable and inviting. He favored modest, informal structures in a naturalistic setting to large, imposing structures.

His father used him as an assistant in designing landscapes for the 1893 Chicago World's Fair. The younger Olmsted had primary responsibility for the 1906 Lewis and Clark Centennial Exposition in Portland, Oregon, and the 1909 Alaska-Yukon-Pacific Exposition.

In 1899, John Olmsted was a founding member and first president of the American Society of Landscape Architects.

== Selected works ==
- 1885 - Tappan Square in Oberlin, Ohio, as part of the redesign of Oberlin College. Designed along with his father Frederick Law Olmsted.
- 1897 - Yerkes Observatory grounds in Williams Bay, Wisconsin. Designed along with his father Frederick Law Olmsted. Updating began in 1906.
- 1899 - Thompson Park, Watertown, New York
- 1902 - Overton Park (342 acres) and Riverside Park (340 acres) in Memphis, Tennessee, as well as a parkway system of broad boulevards.
- 1903 - A comprehensive plan for Seattle's city parks and boulevards. John Olmsted was the firm's principal designer in Seattle and laid out a 20-mile-long system of interconnected parkways that linked parks and playfields, greenways, and natural lakes and waterways including Volunteer Park (Seattle).
- 1903 - Grant Park, Atlanta, Georgia
- 1903 - Washington Park, Portland, Oregon
- 1905 - Anderson Park, Montclair, New Jersey
- 1905 - Druid Hills residential district, Atlanta, Georgia
- 1906 - Oregon State University, a master plan for the Corvallis campus and design and construction of 23 new buildings
- 1907 - Uplands, Greater Victoria, Victoria, British Columbia, a 465-acre garden suburb with estate-sized lots, serpentine streets and signature lamp posts.
- 1908 - Bryn Mawr College, update of general campus landscaping plan designed by his father; design for private garden and a small theater in the round
- 1909 - Alaska-Yukon-Pacific Exposition World's Fair
- 1909 - Comprehensive plan for the University of Washington, Seattle
- 1911 - The grounds of the Washington State Capitol in Olympia, Washington
- 1911 - Fairmount Park in Riverside, California
