= Saanich, British Columbia =

Municipality in British Columbia, Canada

Saanich W̱SÁNEĆ (Straits Salish)
- District municipality
- The Corporation of the District of Saanich
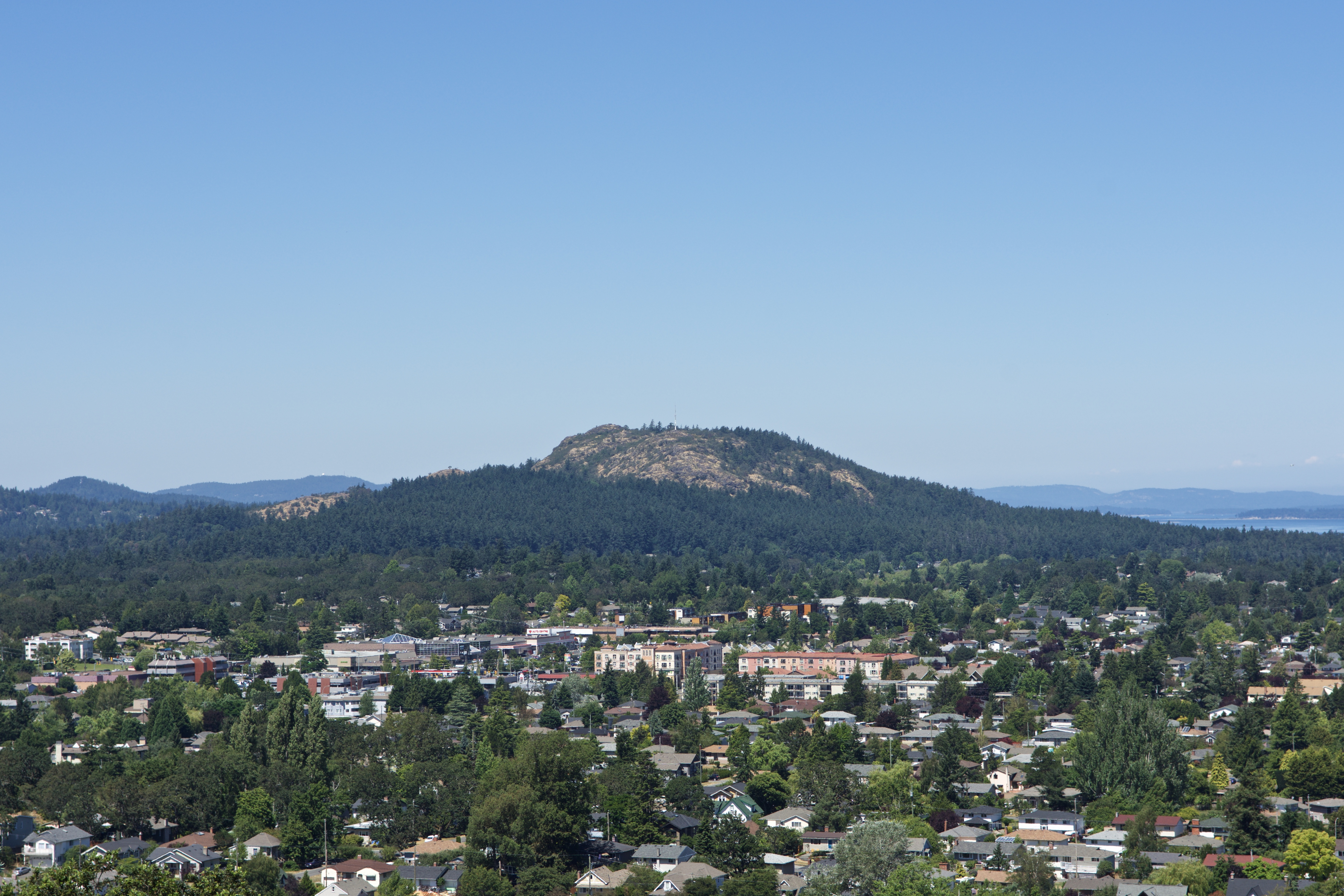
- View of Mount Douglas from the south

- Coat of arms

- Location of Saanich within the Capital Regional District

- Location of Saanich within British Columbia Saanich (British Columbia)
- Coordinates: 48°29′02″N 123°22′52″W
- Country: Canada
- Province: British Columbia
- Regional district: Capital
- Incorporated: 1906

Government
  - Mayor: Rishi Sharma
  - Governing body: Saanich District Council
  - MPs: Elizabeth May (G); Will Greaves (L); Stephanie McLean (L)
  - MLAs: Emily Lowan (Green); Cathie Ounsted (CONS); Diana Gibson (NDP)

Area
  - Land: 103.59 km^{2} (40.00 sq mi)
- Elevation: 23 m (75 ft)

Population (2021)
  - Total: 117,735 (49th)
  - Density: 1,136.6/km^{2} (2,944/sq mi)
- Time zone: UTC−7 (PT)
- Postal code span: V8N-V8Z
- Area codes: 250, 778, 236
- Website: www.saanich.ca

Saanich (/ˈsænɪtʃ/ SAN-ich) is a district municipality on the southern end of Vancouver Island in British Columbia, Canada, within the Greater Victoria area. The population was 117,735 at the 2021 census, making it the most populous municipality in the Capital Regional District and Vancouver Island, and the eighth-most populous in the province. With an area of 103.44 square kilometres (39.94 sq mi), Saanich is also the largest municipality in Greater Victoria. The district adopted its name after the Saanich First Nation, meaning "emerging land" or "emerging people".

Saanich contains a mix of urban, suburban, and rural areas stretching north to the Saanich Peninsula with a wide variety of features including ocean coastlines, freshwater lakes, small rivers, small mountains, rainforests, and agriculture ranging from hay to vineyards. The municipality's topography is undulating with many glacially scoured rock outcroppings. Elevations range from sea level to 229 metres (751 ft). There are 8.1749 square kilometres (3.1563 sq mi) of freshwater lakes and 29.61 kilometres (18.40 mi) of marine shoreline.

Saanich is also home to the northeastern half of the University of Victoria (with the neighbouring district municipality of Oak Bay home to the southwestern half), both campuses of Camosun College, and the Vancouver Island Technology Park.

== History ==
Non-Indigenous history begins with the arrival of the Hudson's Bay Company in the 1840s.

The Craigflower Schoolhouse (originally called Maple Point School), the oldest surviving school building in Western Canada, was built on orders from Kenneth MacKenzie. He came from Scotland with his family in 1852, on the Hudson's Bay Company ship, Norman Morison, to establish a farm for the Puget Sound Agricultural Company, a subsidiary of the Hudson's Bay Company. A school was needed for the children of farm employees, as well as those of arriving settlers.

The Municipality of Saanich was incorporated on March 1, 1906. The Dominion Astrophysical Observatory telescope was designed by John Stanley Plaskett, an astronomer with the Department of the Interior in Ottawa. The 180-centimetre (72 in) reflecting telescope was the largest of its kind in the world when it was built, though this was only the case for a few short months in 1918. The District of Saanich contains a long shoreline with sandy beaches located at several ocean bays. Two of the beaches are Cadboro Bay Beach and Cordova Bay Beach. Cadboro Bay is known as the home of the "Cadborosaurus", a mythical cryptid. Saanich's notable parks include PKOLS (Mount Douglas Park), Mount Tolmie Park (with viewpoints), and Cadboro-Gyro Park.

A citizens' assembly was formed in 2018 to study a merger of Saanich and Victoria; it recommended amalgamation in 2025 and a binding vote was initially scheduled for the following year until it was halted by the provincial government.

== Geography ==
=== Neighbourhoods ===
Saanich is divided into twelve local areas for planning purposes. In addition, there are a number of community associations in the municipality that represent neighbourhoods largely overlapping with the local areas. The Local Areas, and representative community associations, are listed below:

- Blenkinsop. A primarily rural community in a valley situated west of Mount Douglas. Represented by the Blenkinsop Valley Community Association.
- Cadboro Bay. A small village located at the eastern edge of Saanich, bordering on Oak Bay near the University of Victoria. The community also includes the upscale waterfront neighbourhood of Ten Mile Point. Represented by the Cadboro Bay Residents' Association.
- Carey. A suburban community located in western Saanich. Represented by the Residents Association of Strawberry Vale, Marigold and Glanford in the north, and the Mount View Colquitz Community Association in the south.
- Broadmead. Originally developed from Broadmead Farms, it was designed as an architecturally controlled area. The focus of the development was to incorporate homes into the landscape. Large trees could not be cut down to accommodate the homes. Most of the area is considered to be in an urban forest. It is situated near Highway 17 and ends a few blocks west of Cordova Bay Road. The community is represented by the Broadmead Area Residents' Association, BARA.
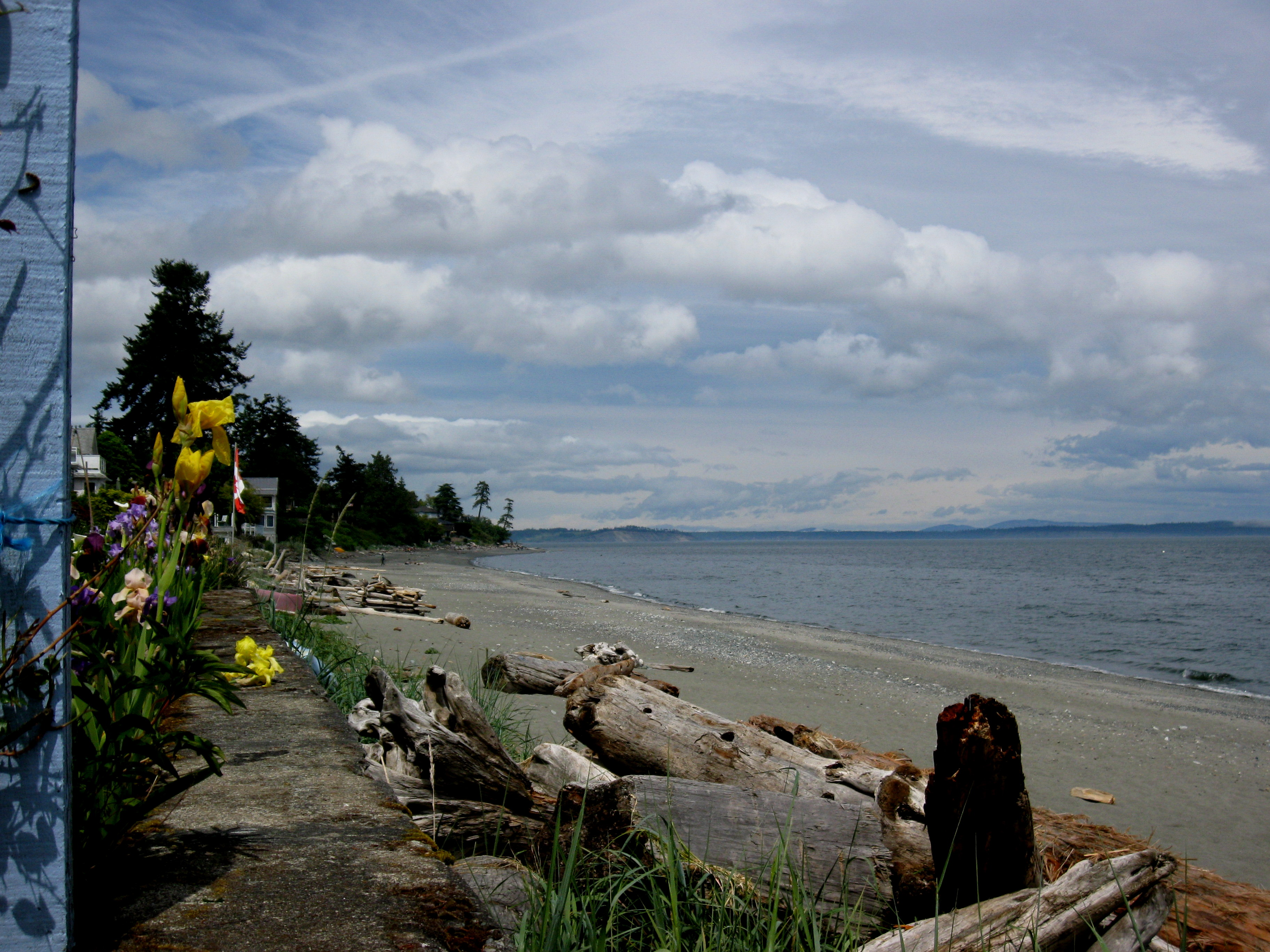
- Cordova Bay Beach
  Cordova Bay. A seaside community in northern Saanich. Represented by the Cordova Bay Association for Community Affairs.
- Gordon Head. A large suburban community to the north of the University of Victoria. Represented by the Gordon Head Residents' Association.
- North Quadra. A suburban community in the centre of the municipality. Represented by the North Quadra Community Association.
- Quadra. A large urban and suburban community surrounding the urban core of Saanich. Contains the Cedar Hill Golf Course and is represented by the Quadra Cedar Hill Community Association.
- Royal Oak. A suburban community at the rural edge of Saanich. Represented by the Royal Oak Community Association, Falaise Community Association, and the Broadmead Area Residents' Association.
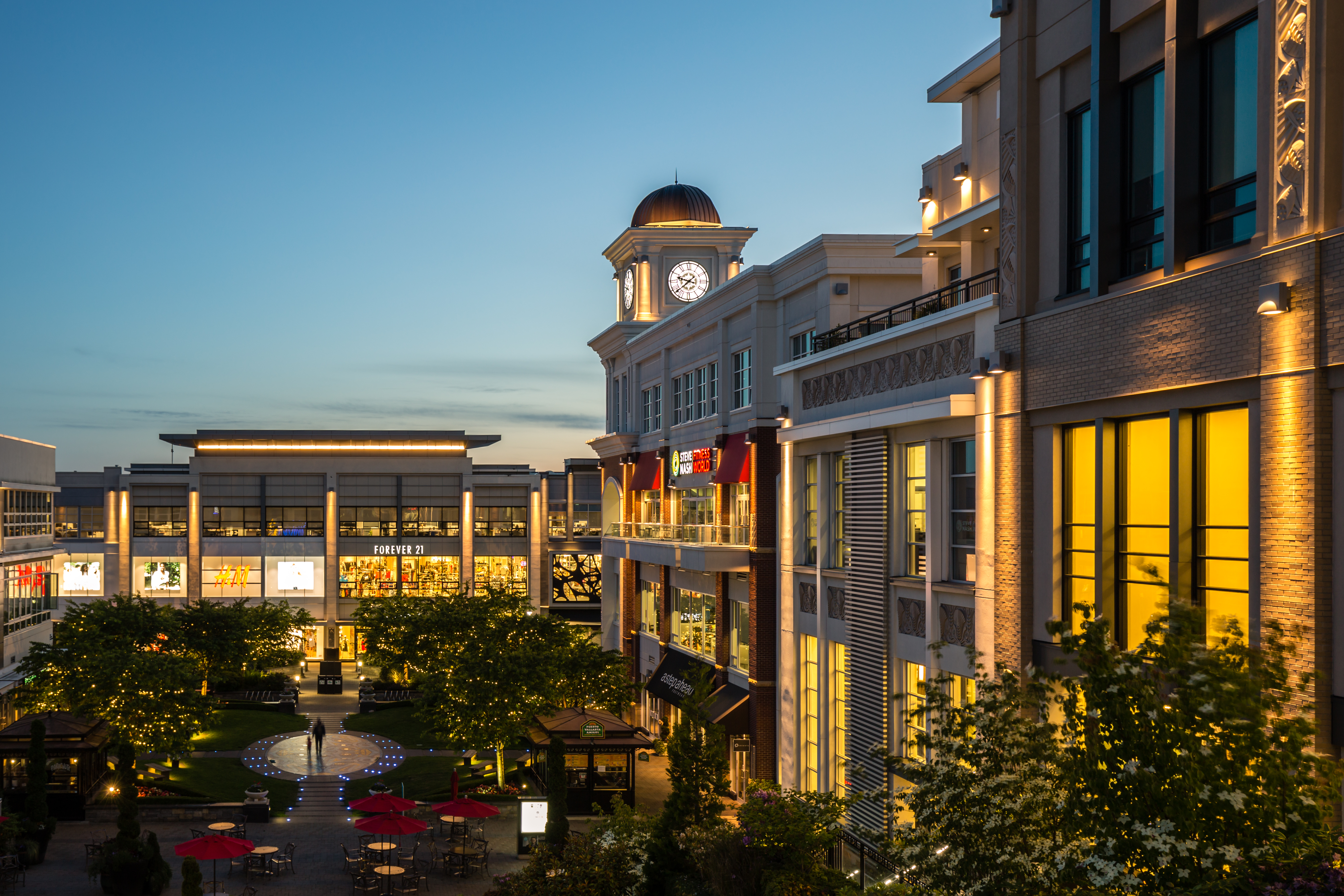
- Uptown Mall, Saanich, British Columbia
  Rural Saanich. The largest Local Area by area, this part of Saanich is sparsely populated and mostly rural. Represented in part by the Prospect Lake and District Community Association.
- Saanich Core. The urban centre of the District of Saanich. Contains Uptown and the municipal hall. Represented by part of the Mount View Community Association and part of the Quadra Cedar Hill Community Association.
- Shelbourne. An urban and suburban community stretching between the City of Victoria and the University of Victoria. Represented by the Mount Tolmie Community Association and Camosun Community Association.
- Tillicum. An urban and suburban community along the Gorge in western Saanich. Represented by the Gorge Tillicum Community Association.

=== Climate ===
Climate data for University of Victoria (Oak Bay / Saanich) WMO ID: 71783; coordinates 48°27′25″N 123°18′17″W; elevation: 60.1 m (197 ft); 1991–2020 normals
Month	Jan	Feb	Mar	Apr	May	Jun	Jul	Aug	Sep	Oct	Nov	Dec	Year
Record high humidex	19.6	16.6	21.9	25.3	31.3	41.9	40.4	35.0	33.4	31.1	20.5	20.9	40.4
Record high °C (°F)	15.2 (59.4)	16.5 (61.7)	21.0 (69.8)	25.0 (77.0)	28.8 (83.8)	37.9 (100.2)	37.6 (99.7)	34.5 (94.1)	30.2 (86.4)	23.5 (74.3)	19.0 (66.2)	16.5 (61.7)	37.6 (99.7)
Mean maximum °C (°F)	12.7 (54.9)	13.2 (55.8)	16.1 (61.0)	20.0 (68.0)	25.4 (77.7)	27.8 (82.0)	30.1 (86.2)	29.8 (85.6)	26.2 (79.2)	19.6 (67.3)	15.0 (59.0)	12.7 (54.9)	31.7 (89.1)
Mean daily maximum °C (°F)	8.2 (46.8)	8.8 (47.8)	11.0 (51.8)	14.0 (57.2)	17.9 (64.2)	20.6 (69.1)	23.7 (74.7)	23.5 (74.3)	20.0 (68.0)	14.3 (57.7)	10.3 (50.5)	8.0 (46.4)	15.0 (59.0)
Daily mean °C (°F)	5.8 (42.4)	5.9 (42.6)	7.5 (45.5)	9.8 (49.6)	12.9 (55.2)	15.4 (59.7)	17.7 (63.9)	17.7 (63.9)	15.0 (59.0)	10.7 (51.3)	7.6 (45.7)	5.5 (41.9)	11.0 (51.8)
Mean daily minimum °C (°F)	3.4 (38.1)	2.9 (37.2)	3.9 (39.0)	5.5 (41.9)	7.9 (46.2)	10.2 (50.4)	11.7 (53.1)	11.8 (53.2)	10.1 (50.2)	7.2 (45.0)	4.7 (40.5)	3.1 (37.6)	6.9 (44.4)
Mean minimum °C (°F)	−2.3 (27.9)	−2.1 (28.2)	−0.8 (30.6)	1.1 (34.0)	3.5 (38.3)	6.5 (43.7)	8.6 (47.5)	8.9 (48.0)	6.1 (43.0)	2.2 (36.0)	−1.2 (29.8)	−2.8 (27.0)	−5.4 (22.3)
Record low °C (°F)	−11.7 (10.9)	−7.2 (19.0)	−4.1 (24.6)	−0.6 (30.9)	0.2 (32.4)	5.1 (41.2)	6.2 (43.2)	7.2 (45.0)	3.6 (38.5)	−2.1 (28.2)	−9.5 (14.9)	−11.2 (11.8)	−11.2 (11.8)
Record low wind chill	−15.4	−11.8	−9.0	−1.7	0.0	0.0	0.0	0.0	0.0	−3.3	−12.4	−14.5	−15.4
Average precipitation mm (inches)	109.6 (4.31)	59.6 (2.35)	52.6 (2.07)	35.6 (1.40)	29.2 (1.15)	19.7 (0.78)	10.7 (0.42)	15.6 (0.61)	30.4 (1.20)	77.2 (3.04)	123.2 (4.85)	97.8 (3.85)	661.2 (26.03)
Average precipitation days (≥ 0.2 mm)	18.7	15.1	17.2	13.2	11.2	9.1	4.8	5.2	11.1	17.8	21.4	19.3	164.0
Average relative humidity (%) (at 1500 LST)	83.3	75.5	70.5	63.8	60.8	58.0	55.5	57.8	65.7	76.6	81.9	82.8	69.3
Average dew point °C (°F)	3.8 (38.8)	3.1 (37.6)	4.1 (39.4)	5.5 (41.9)	8.0 (46.4)	10.0 (50.0)	11.9 (53.4)	12.4 (54.3)	11.1 (52.0)	8.4 (47.1)	5.6 (42.1)	3.6 (38.5)	7.3 (45.1)
Source 1: Environment and Climate Change Canada
Source 2: weatherstats.ca (for dewpoint and monthly&yearly average absolute maximum&minimum temperature)

== Demographics ==
In the 2021 Canadian census conducted by Statistics Canada, Saanich had a population of 117,735 living in 48,048 of its 50,064 total private dwellings, a change of 3.1% from its 2016 population of 114,148. With a land area of 103.59 square kilometres (40.00 sq mi), it had a population density of 1,136.5/km^{2} (2,943.6/sq mi) in 2021.

Historical census populations – Saanich, British Columbia

Year	Pop.	±%
1941	18,173	—
1951	28,481	+56.7%
1956	38,358	+34.7%
1961	48,876	+27.4%
1966	58,845	+20.4%
1971	65,040	+10.5%

Year	Pop.	±%
1976	73,383	+12.8%
1981	78,710	+7.3%
1986	82,940	+5.4%
1991	95,577	+15.2%
1996	101,388	+6.1%
2001	103,654	+2.2%

Year	Pop.	±%
2006	108,265	+4.4%
2011	109,752	+1.4%
2016	114,148	+4.0%
2021	117,735	+3.1%

Population counts are not adjusted for boundary changes.
Source: Statistics Canada

=== Ethnicity ===
Panethnic groups in the District of Saanich (2001−2021)
Panethnic group	2021		2016		2011		2006		2001	
Panethnic group	Pop.	%	Pop.	%	Pop.	%	Pop.	%	Pop.	%
European (Note: Statistic includes all persons that did not make up part of a visible minority or an indigenous identity.)	82,645	71.55%	83,595	74.75%	85,510	79.28%	88,240	82.37%	86,985	84.88%
East Asian (Note: Statistic includes total responses of "Chinese", "Korean", and "Japanese" under visible minority section on census.)	12,425	10.76%	11,730	10.49%	9,300	8.62%	8,710	8.13%	7,550	7.37%
South Asian	6,605	5.72%	5,640	5.04%	4,125	3.82%	4,365	4.07%	3,760	3.67%
Southeast Asian (Note: Statistic includes total responses of "Filipino" and "Southeast Asian" under visible minority section on census.)	4,485	3.88%	3,435	3.07%	2,635	2.44%	1,615	1.51%	1,160	1.13%
Indigenous	4,015	3.48%	3,490	3.12%	2,930	2.72%	1,990	1.86%	1,470	1.43%
African	1,510	1.31%	1,155	1.03%	1,200	1.11%	550	0.51%	625	0.61%
Middle Eastern (Note: Statistic includes total responses of "West Asian" and "Arab" under visible minority section on census.)	1,415	1.23%	1,110	0.99%	725	0.67%	495	0.46%	315	0.31%
Latin American	1,225	1.06%	815	0.73%	760	0.7%	720	0.67%	400	0.39%
Other/multiracial (Note: Statistic includes total responses of "Visible minority, n.i.e." and "Multiple visible minorities" under visible minority section on census.)	1,190	1.03%	870	0.78%	685	0.64%	440	0.41%	230	0.22%
Total responses	115,505	98.11%	111,835	97.97%	107,860	98.28%	107,120	98.94%	102,485	98.87%
Total population	117,735	100%	114,148	100%	109,752	100%	108,265	100%	103,654	100%
Note: Totals greater than 100% due to multiple origin responses

=== Religion ===
According to the 2021 census, religious groups in Saanich included:

- Irreligion (66,460 persons or 57.5%)
- Christianity (38,645 persons or 33.5%)
- Sikhism (3,250 persons or 2.8%)
- Islam (1,855 persons or 1.6%)
- Buddhism (1,520 persons or 1.3%)
- Hinduism (1,370 persons or 1.2%)
- Judaism (760 persons or 0.7%)
- Indigenous spirituality (100 persons or 0.1%)

Religious groups in the District of Saanich (1991−2021)
Religious group	2021 Canadian census		2011 Canadian census		2001 Canadian census		1991 Canadian census	
Religious group	Pop.	%	Pop.	%	Pop.	%	Pop.	%
Irreligion	66,460	57.54%	51,825	48.05%	36,675	35.78%	26,330	27.78%
Christianity	38,645	33.46%	48,640	45.1%	59,760	58.31%	64,510	68.07%
Sikhism	3,250	2.81%	2,380	2.21%	2,570	2.51%	2,055	2.17%
Islam	1,855	1.61%	1,120	1.04%	425	0.41%	305	0.32%
Buddhism	1,520	1.32%	1,555	1.44%	1,305	1.27%	540	0.57%
Hinduism	1,370	1.19%	650	0.6%	545	0.53%	335	0.35%
Judaism	760	0.66%	555	0.51%	490	0.48%	265	0.28%
Indigenous spirituality	100	0.09%	25	0.02%	30	0.03%	—N/a	—N/a
Other	1,540	1.33%	1,105	1.02%	685	0.67%	430	0.45%
Total responses	115,505	98.11%	107,860	98.28%	102,490	98.88%	94,775	99.16%
Total population	117,735	100%	109,752	100%	103,654	100%	95,577	100%

== Government ==
The Saanich District Council is the governing body of the municipality of Saanich. The council consists of the Mayor and eight councillors.

- Mayor: Rishi Sharma (SOS)
- Councillors: Lorne DeLarge (SOS), Nancy Di Castri (SOS), Colin Plant, Laurie Lidstone (SOS), Graham Wright (SOS), Matt McGeachie (SOS), Nathalie Chambers, & Teale Phelps Bondaroff

SOS - Save Our Saanich, a municipal electoral slate

== Education ==
The northeastern half of British Columbia's third-largest university, the University of Victoria campus, is in Saanich, while the southwestern portion is in neighbouring Oak Bay. Saanich is also home to both major campuses of Camosun College, the original Lansdowne campus, and the Interurban campus.

Saanich is divided between two bordering school districts, School District 61 Greater Victoria and School District 63 Saanich. It is also the home of South Island Distance Education School.

== See also ==
- Elk/Beaver Lake Regional Park
- Murder of Reena Virk
- Murder of Lindsay Buziak
