= Royal Victoria Yacht Club =

Yacht club

- Heraldic badge

- Burgee

- Ensign
- Short name: RVYC
- Founded: 1892
- Location: Oak Bay, British Columbia
- Website: https://www.rvyc.bc.ca

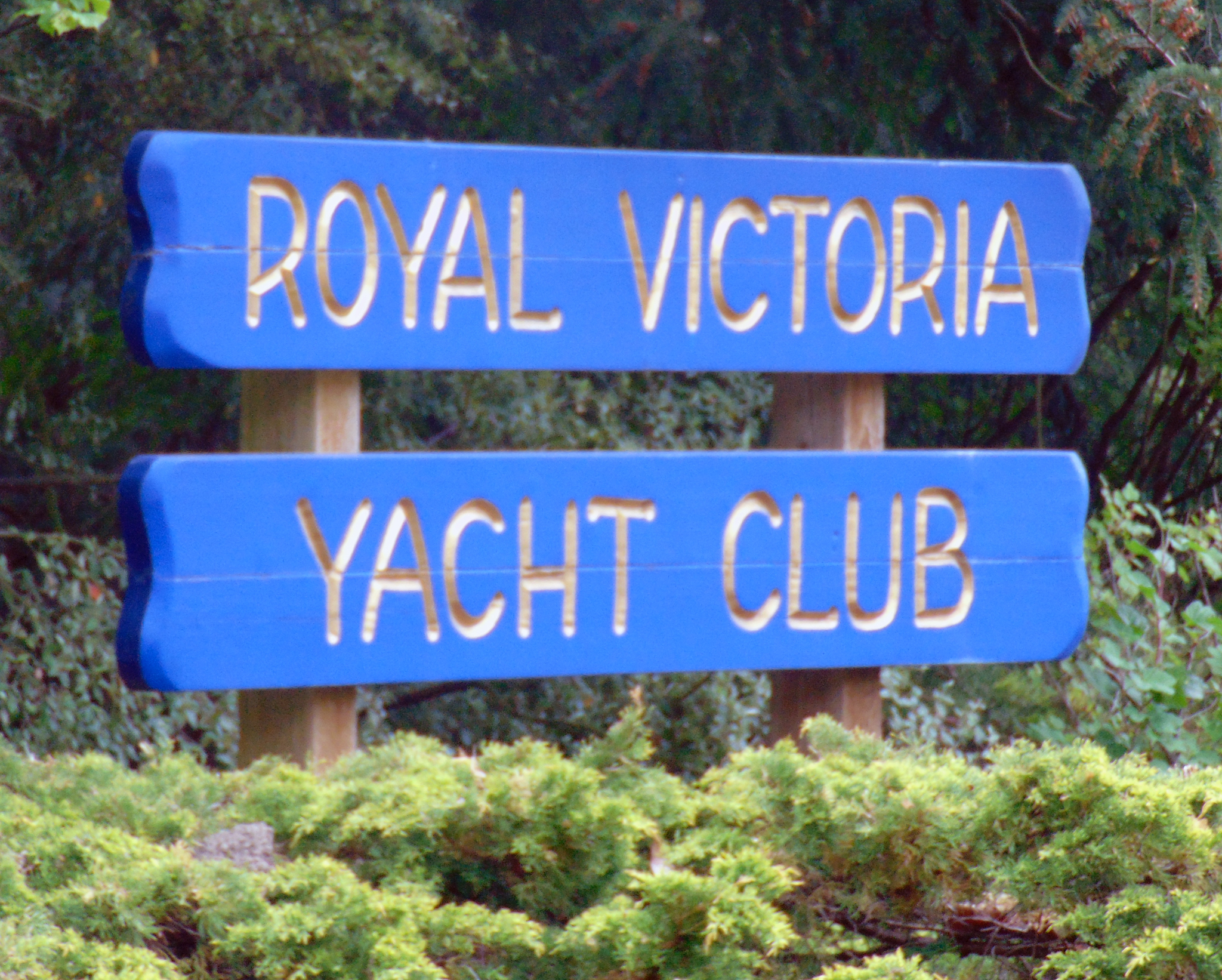
Sign at the entrance to the Royal Victoria Yacht Club in Victoria, British Columbia.

The Royal Victoria Yacht Club is located along the shores of Cadboro Bay in The Uplands a neighbourhood of Oak Bay, adjacent to the city of Victoria, British Columbia, Canada, and has facilities at Tsehum Haven near Sidney.

== History ==
The Royal Victoria Yacht Club was formed on June 8, 1892, and moved in 1912 to its current location, at the location of the old Hudson's Bay Company cattle wharf. The Royal Victoria Yacht Club is the oldest yacht club in British Columbia.

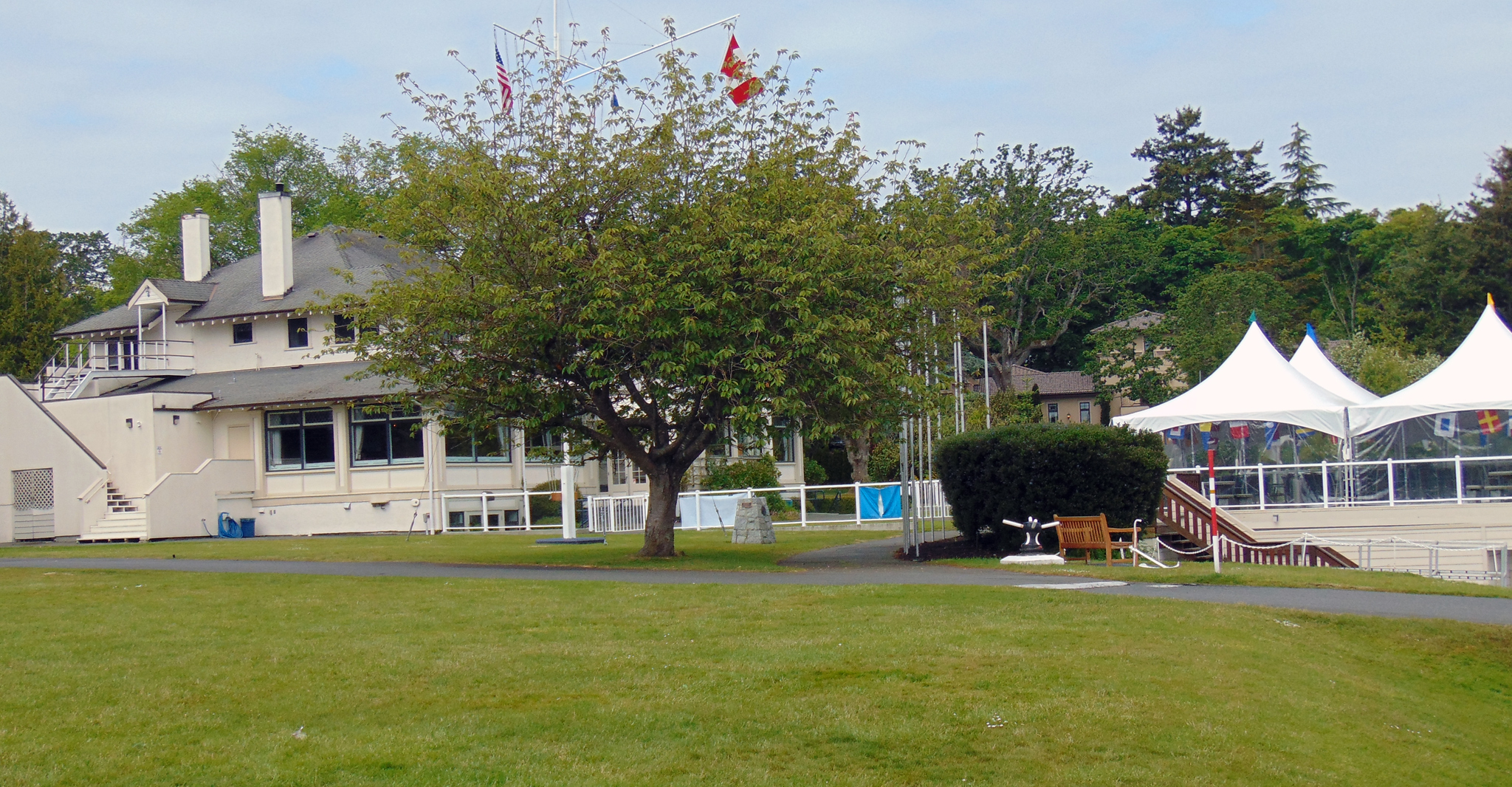
The clubhouse at the Royal Victoria Yacht Club.

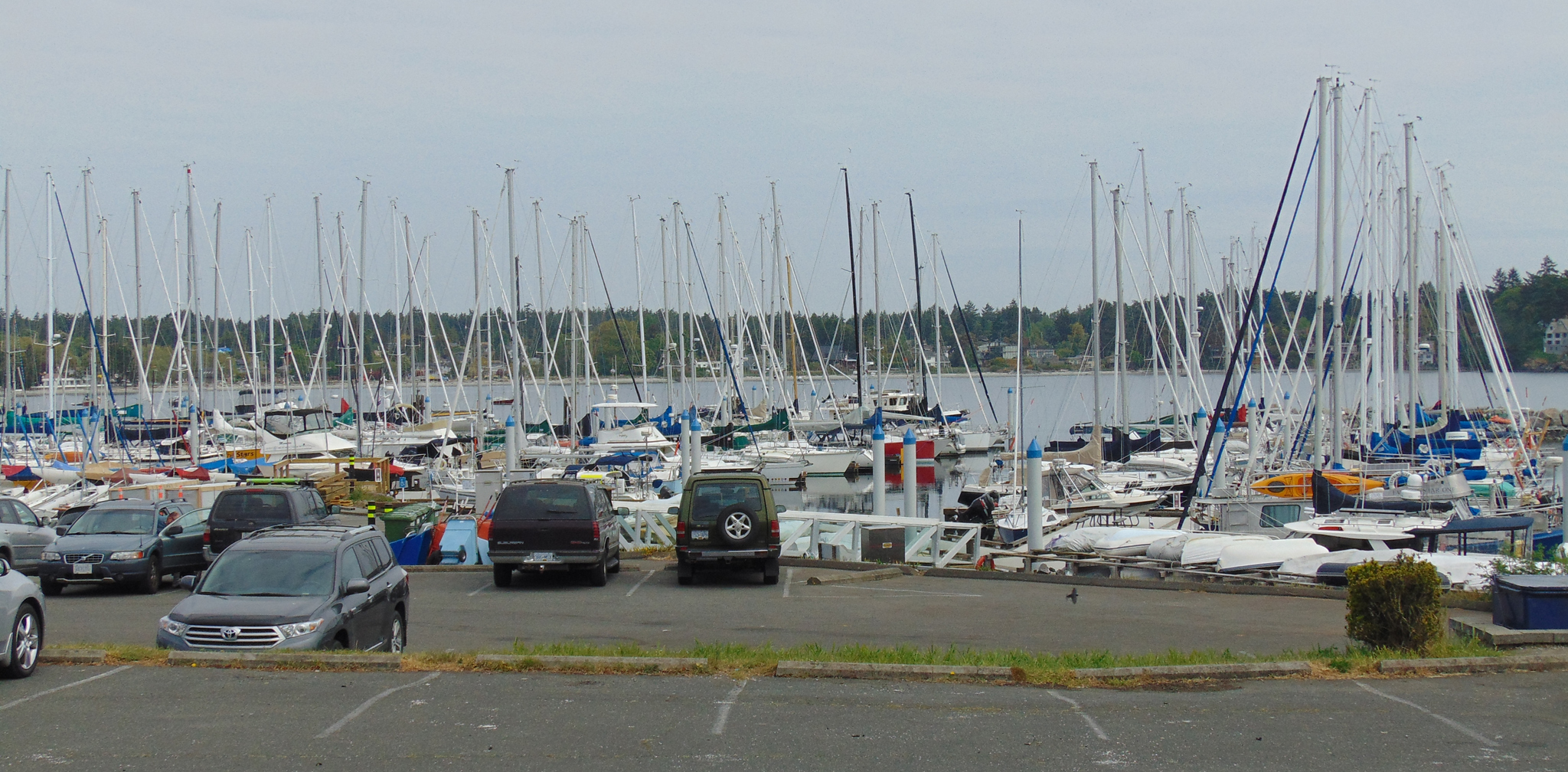
Part of the docking area.

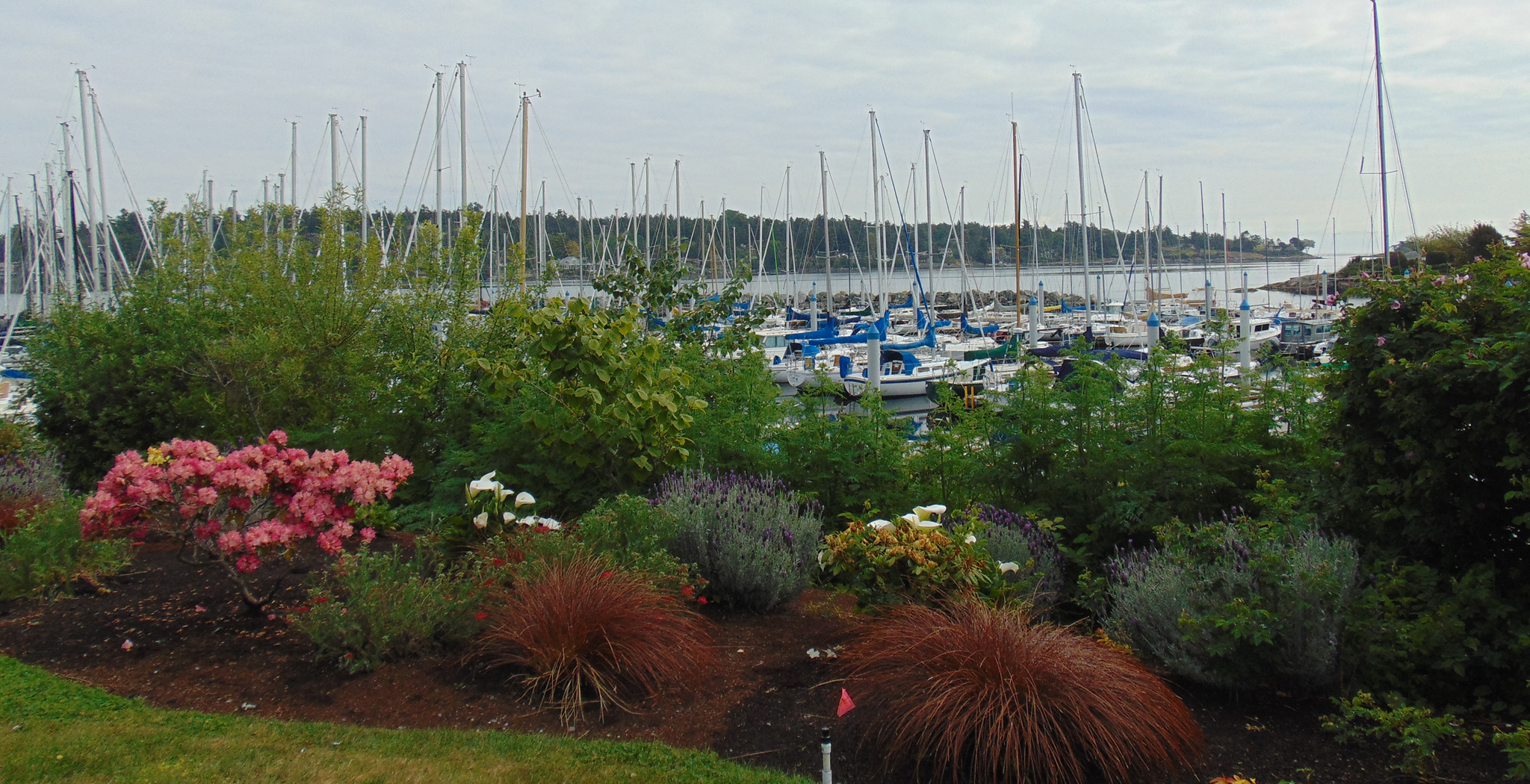
Gardens and sailboat masts.

Through the years, the club has hosted a number of regattas and sailing races, including a racing program for young sailors
