= Willows Beach =

Beach in Oak Bay, British Columbia, Canada

Coordinates: 48°26′01″N 123°18′13″W

View towards the sea

Willows Beach, Victoria is a beachfront in the Municipality of Oak Bay, in Victoria, British Columbia. Along Willows Beach is Willows Park, where a tea-room is run by the Kiwanis Club in spring and summer. It takes its name from the Willows Fairground built in 1891 and which remained Greater Victoria's main horse-racing venue during the early years of the twentieth century. The Willows Racetrack was situated nearly a kilometre (about a half a mile) inland from the beach, so named because of the willow trees that grew there.

This was the site of the ancient Salish Sea seaport of Sitchanalth. Archaeological digs have identified a Coast Salish permanent encampment of several thousand people for generations. The centre of the community was at the mouth of Bowker Creek where currently the well known private school Glenlyon Norfolk School (GNS) is located. This is the site of what is hypothesized to be the main long-house of the village. The latest theory is that the whole seaport was destroyed by the Great Salish Sea (Seattle) tsunami of 930AD.

== Activities ==
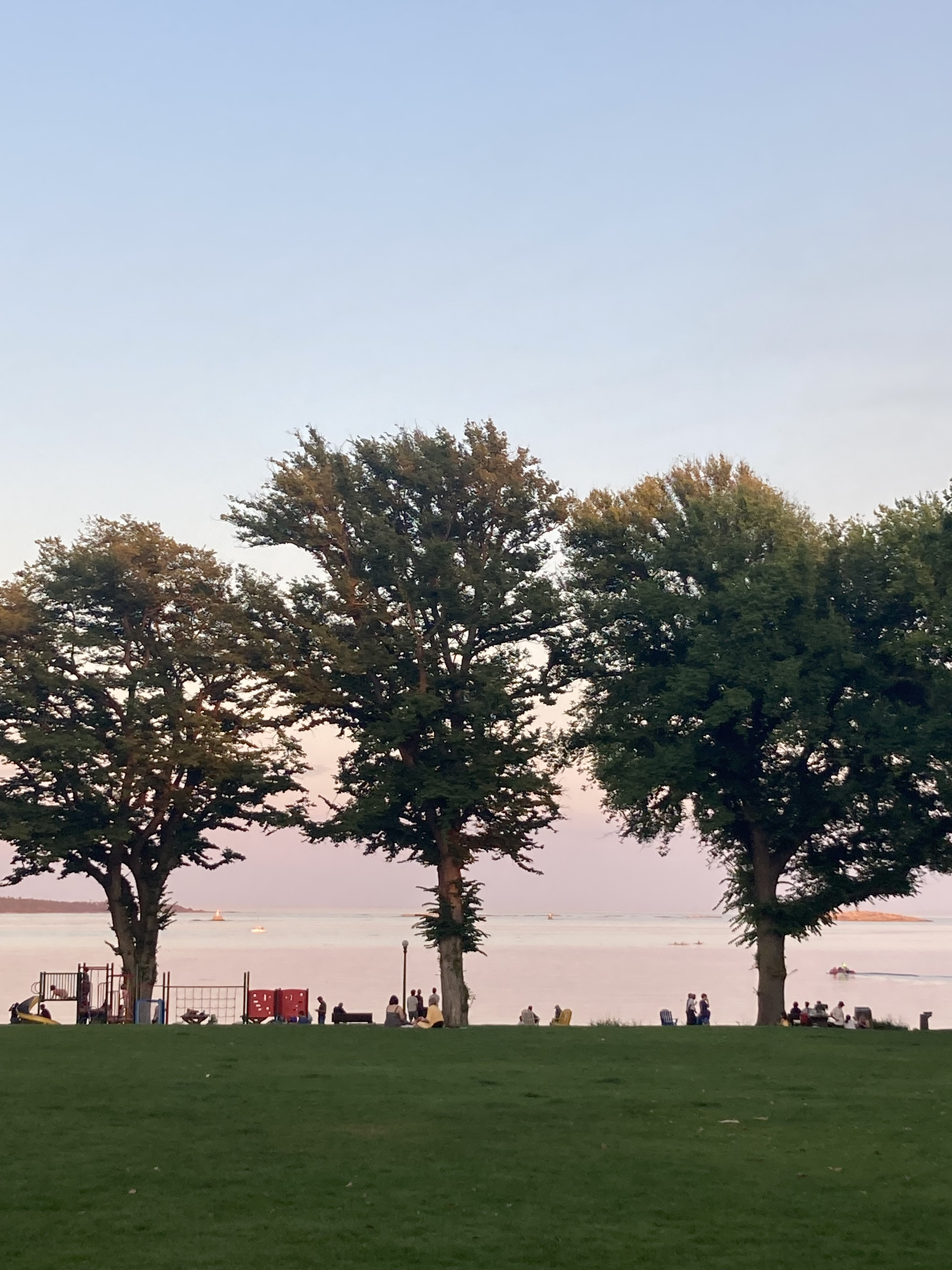
Park and playground areas at Willows Beach

Willows Beach is a very actively used beach and park in Victoria. On summer days the public areas are usually packed with people. Various clubs and organizations often hold gatherings in Willows Park, including rallies, club meetings, poetry readings, barbecues and family gatherings.

There are areas where the public can set up volleyball courts and often on the weekend the spaces are filled quickly.

Willows Beach is also the location of the annual Oak Bay Tea Party, in which people from all over Victoria participate, enjoying the rides, shows, games, and the parade which runs all around Oak Bay.

To the very north of the beach, is Uplands Park to the left (North) of Beach Drive and Cattle Point on the water side of the road (South). Cattle Point is the site of the Cattle Point Star Sanctuary (aka Cattle Point Dark Sky Star Park). This is also the site of the world's largest orrery, The Salish Sea Walk of the Planets.

There are a quite a few trails in this area. Skimboarders frequent the beach in the spring and summer. The north and south ends are shallower, which are more ideal for skimboarding. The north end of the beach at Cattle Point is the start and end of the Salish Sea Walk of the Planets, and the local stretch, the Oak Bay Walk of the Planets. [Mercury] is located by the Kiwanis Tea Room. Visitors can enjoy a wonderful two hour walk around the inner solar system enjoying the coastline and back gardens of Oak Bay.
