= William and Ann (1818 Bermuda ship) =

History

United Kingdom
- Name: William and Mary
- Owner: 1823:D.Seon; 1824:Hudson's Bay Company
- Builder: Bermuda
- Launched: 1818
- Fate: Wrecked 10 March 1829

General characteristics
- Tons burthen: 161, or 162, or 167 (bm)
- Sail plan: Snow

William and Ann was launched in Bermuda in 1818. In 1824 the Hudson's Bay Company (HBC) purchased William and Ann. In 1825 she became the first HBC vessel to trade with the Pacific Northwest, competing directly with the Boston fur traders. She made three voyages to Fort George on the Columbia River, and was lost on 10 March 1829 on her fourth as she was arriving there.

== Career ==
William and Ann first appeared in Lloyd's Register (LR) in 1823.

Year	Master	Owner	Trade	Source
1823	D.Seon	D.Seon	London–Bermuda	LR
1826	D.Seon; Hanwell	D.Seon; Hudson's Bay Company	London–Bermuda	LR; small repairs 1826

== Hudson's Bay Company ==
Hudson's Bay Company flag (1801–1965)

The HBC purchased William and Ann, and her stores, on 19 May 1824 for £1,500. Henry Hanwell Jr. was her master from 1824 to 1828. She sailed from Gravesend on 27 July and on 12 April 1825 anchored at Fort George. She carried as a passenger the noted botanist Davi Douglas, who was on a plant-gathering expedition for the Royal Horticultural Society. (Note: One of the plants he described, Pseudotsuga menziesii, would later be called the Douglas fir.)

On 25 June William and Ann crossed the bar on her way north to Portland Canal. The aims of the voyage were to trade with the natives and to get information on American trade in the region. The HBC expected that the region would become British territory after negotiations being undertaken with the Russians. On 30 July at Nootka Sound. She then visited the Strait of Georgia and spent about a month trading there. On 3 September she crossed the bar at the Columbia River, and arrived at Fort George on 5 September. On her cruise William and Ann had gathered 400 skins.

On 25 October William and Ann crossed the bar on the way back to London. She arrived back at London on 5 April 1826.

On 25 September 1826 William and Ann sailed for the Columbia River in company with another HBC vessel, the schooner Cadboro. William and Ann sailed via the Sandwich Islands and anchored off Fort Vancouver on 10 May 1827.

William and Ann left on 6 July but did not clear the Columbia River until 23 August. She arrived in the Channel on 6 February 1828.

On 16 September 1828 William and Ann, John Swan, master, sailed from Plymouth, bound for Fort Vancouver. She sailed in company with Ganymede, which was under charter to the HBC. The two vessels parted in the Bay of Biscay on 24 September.

== Fate ==
On 10 March 1829 William and Ann was wrecked on the bar of the Columbia River. All 26 people on board died. Initially the death of most of them was attributed to an attack by the local Clatsop people.

The Clatsop were later exonerated, but only after a punitive expedition from Fort Vancouver had burnt one of their villages and killed a number of its inhabitants. The expedition aimed not only to impress the power of the HBC upon the local inhabitants, but also to recover what could be recovered of William and Ann's cargo.

The loss of William and Mary was a blow to the HBC's operations. In 1829–1830, American ships, including Owhyhee and Convoy, out of Boston, entered the Columbia and traded for fur.
