= Cadboro Bay =

Bay in British Columbia, Canada

Coordinates: 48.457746°N 123.292859°W

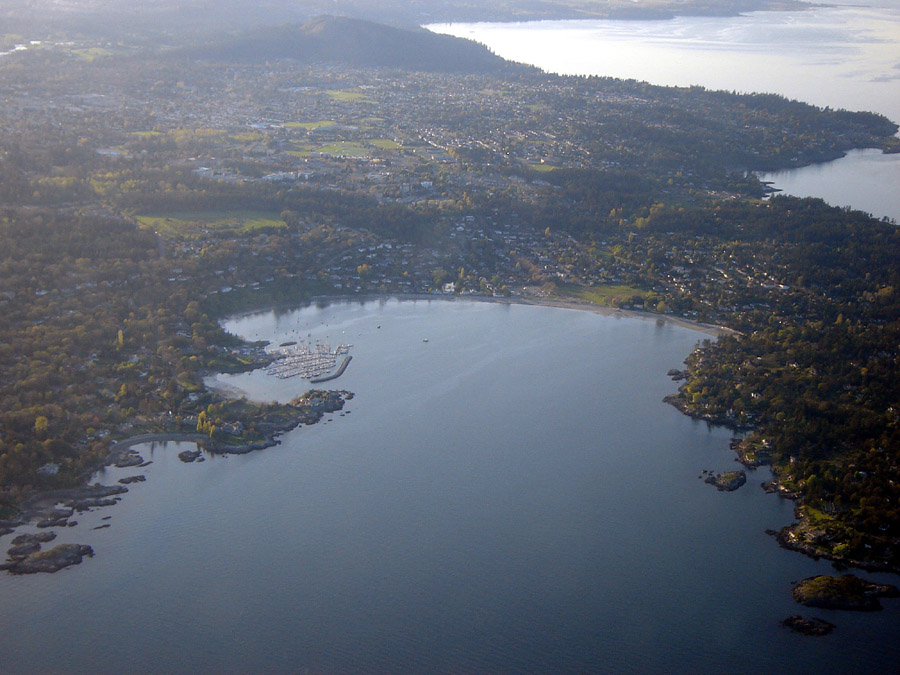
Cadboro Bay

Cadboro Bay is a bay near the southern tip of Vancouver Island and its adjacent neighbourhood in the municipalities of Saanich and Oak Bay in Greater Victoria, British Columbia, Canada.

Cadboro Bay was the site of Sungayka, a village of the Songhees Nation for some 8,000 years prior to the relocation of its people to Victoria's Inner Harbour in the mid 1800s. The land between Gyro Park and Telegraph Bay is included in a Douglas Treaty that is now before the courts. Cadboro Bay takes its name from the first European vessel to enter the bay, the Hudson's Bay Company schooner Cadboro.

During the 1862 Pacific Northwest smallpox epidemic, which started in Victoria, thousands of indigenous people living in and around Victoria were evicted by force as smallpox spread among them. Hundreds of Haida fled one native encampment and set up another on the shore of Cadboro Bay. In May 1862 the Victoria Police Commissioner Augustus Pemberton took a police force and two recently arrived gunboats, HMS Grappler and HMS Forward, to the Haida camp on Cadboro Bay. They forced about 300 natives, many already infected with smallpox, to evacuate and return to Haida Gwaii. One of the gunboats escorted the canoes north beyond Nanaimo.

Today, Cadboro Bay also gives its name to the neighbourhood situated between the bay itself and the University of Victoria, bounded by the Uplands district to the south, Ten Mile Point to the east and the Queenswood neighbourhood to the north. At the heart of the neighbourhood is the local centre, Cadboro Bay Village.

A prominent resident of the neighbourhood in the first half of the 20th century was Frank V. Hobbs. His brother, Edwin, bought land in Cadboro Bay for a dairy farm, while Frank Hobbs engaged in business in Victoria and other parts of Vancouver Island. Upon Edwin's death, Frank moved to Cadboro Bay and became active in municipal politics and on the Victoria School Board. He was influential in expanding the provision of high schools for greater Victoria. In recognition of this and other services he provided to the area, the local elementary school, opened in 1951, was named in his honour.

The Royal Victoria Yacht Club is located on the Oak Bay side of the bay and is situated on a large archeological site of the Songhees Nation. The University of Victoria is located just up the hill from Cadboro Bay, and the UVic Sailing Club maintains facilities and boats on Cadboro Bay beach for the use of its students.

Cadboro Bay is located within the boundaries of the Victoria Harbour Migratory Bird Sanctuary, which is critical habitat for many species, including several that are listed under the Species at Risk Act.

Cadboro Bay gives its name to a type of sea serpent, Cadborosaurus, nicknamed Caddy.

== Cadboro-Gyro Park ==
Immediately adjacent to the beach itself is Cadboro-Gyro park. The park is popular with children in the neighbourhood as well as other parts of Victoria due to its large concrete climbing structures, in the form of an octopus, a large salmon, a tugboat and the local Cryptid, the sea monster Cadborosaurus.

The park was created on 4.37 acres (1.77 ha) of land bought from the Goward estate by the Gyro Club in 1953, which it donated to Saanich in 1954, and subsequently increased in 1961 by the expropriation of adjacent land by Saanich. The park is now 6.022 hectares (14.88 acres). In the summer of 2014 the play area was improved, including the relocation of the octopus and salmon.

Cadboro-Gyro Park is home to the only remaining population of yellow sand verbena in the District of Saanich.
