= Tappan Square =

Park in Ohio, United States

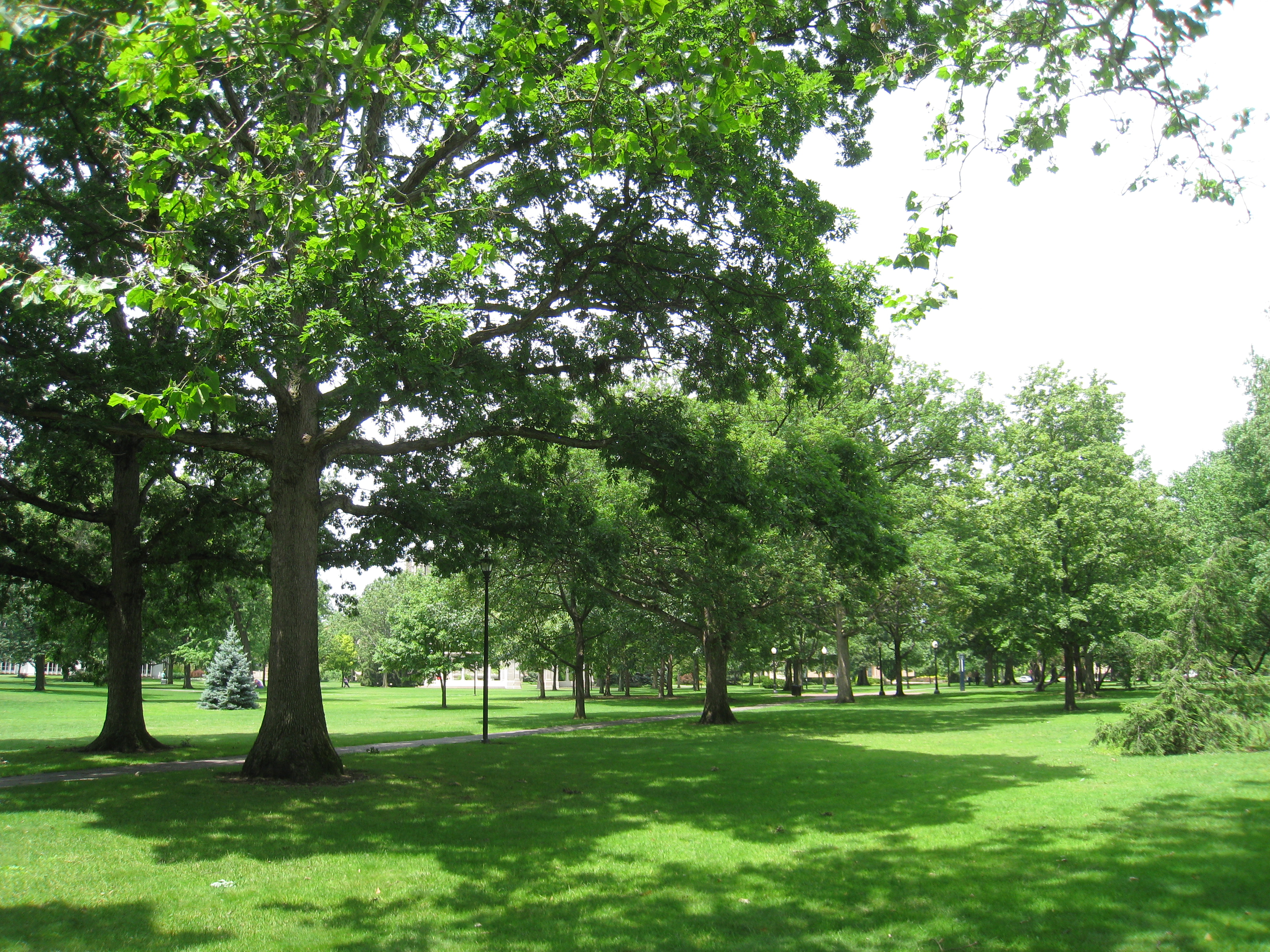

- Location within Ohio
- Type: Urban park
- Location: Oberlin, Ohio, United States
- Coordinates: 41°17′33″N 82°13′06″W
- Area: 13.01 acres (5.26 ha)
- Created: 1885
- Operator: City of Oberlin, OH
- Status: Open all year
- Tappan Square
- U.S. National Register of Historic Places
- U.S. National Historic Landmark
- Architect: Frederick Law Olmsted Jr., John Charles Olmsted
- NRHP reference No.: 66000615
- Designated NHL: 1965

Tappan Square is a public park and National Historic Landmark at the center of Oberlin, Ohio. The park initially opened in 1885, on 13 acres (5.3 ha) of city-owned land at the bequest of Oberlin College benefactor Charles Martin Hall. It was designed by the esteemed duo of Frederick Law Olmsted Jr. and John Charles Olmsted. The square in Oberlin was named in the 1940s, in honor of Arthur and Lewis Tappan, wealthy merchants of New York City who supported Oberlin College in its early days and who were ardent abolitionists. The square was previously known as College Park or the Campus. Until 1965 it held the Historic Elm, under which John Jay Shipherd and Philo Stewart were said to have knelt and prayed to God and on which spot they decided to found the town. The square held college buildings for many years, including a five-story brick college classroom and men's dormitory called Tappan Hall. As the buildings on the square grew older, the area was cleaned up as a green space for the community, removing the buildings, in accordance with the provisions of the will of Charles Martin Hall.

== History ==
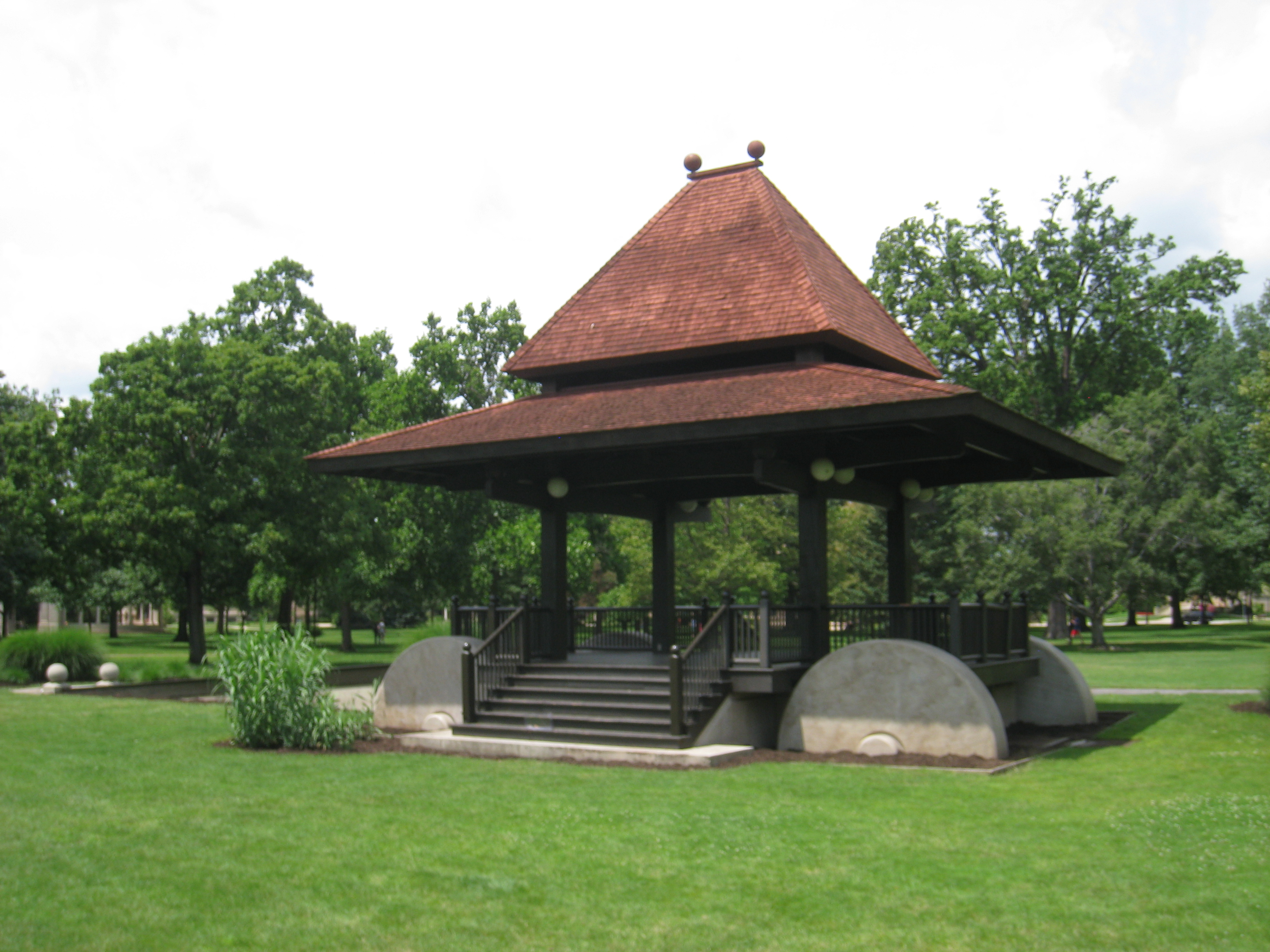
The Clark Bandstand

The site was founded by the presbyterian ministers John Jay Shipherd and Philo Stewart who declared their new community at the elm on the park's southeast corner. The historic elm remained on the square until disease expedited its removal in 1965. A year later, Tappan Square was granted landmark status. The park is named after Arthur Tappan, a 19th-century abolitionist who financially sustained the college in its early years. Initially known as "the Campus," the square was home to several college buildings. At the bequest of 1885 alumnus and ALCOA founder Charles Martin Hall, the buildings were removed in order to designate the center of campus as a center for both students and community members. To this day, the only structures that remain in the square are the Clark Bandstand and the Memorial Arch.

The site hosts many events, for both the college and community. Among the more common are festivals, bonfires, rallies, concerts, vigils, and marches, but Tappan also provides a home for Commencement, Oberlin Folk Fest, Local Foods Festival, OSCA bonfire, Beltane, and Juneteenth. It also houses the Oberlin Rocks, which can be painted on at any time by college students, and a small group of albino squirrels, Oberlin's unofficial mascot. Events in Tappan are free and geared toward building community between college students and Oberlin residents.

== The Memorial Arch ==
Oberlin College originally included a department of theology, whose students worked as missionaries worldwide. One particular common site for Oberlin-trained missions was China's Shanxi province. In 1899, several dozen Oberlin missionaries were murdered during the Boxer Rebellion, led by a group of Chinese nationalists. Recently, a plaque has been added to the Arch to honor the Chinese nationals who also were killed in the violence.

== The Oberlin Rocks ==
The two largest boulders in Tappan's south corners were placed in 1897 and 1933. The southwest corner's rock contains a plaque reading "Glacial boulder of granitoid gneiss from eastern Canada, excavated from 10 feet below the surface of the northwest corner of Professor and Morgan streets and placed here by the class of '98 during the night of Dec. 3 1897." The other rock, known as the "Founders Boulder", was found in Erie County and has a plaque that reads "In Memory of John J. Shipherd, Philo P. Stewart, Dedicated June 17, 1933." However, both plaques have been covered by hundreds of layers of paint by students and town residents and are currently invisible. The rocks first started their tenure as "public billboards" in the 1960s and soon even college officials joined in the tradition of painting the rocks. Today, they can be painted by anyone at absolutely anytime.
