= Cadboro (1824 schooner) =

History

United Kingdom of Great Britain and Ireland
- Name: Cadboro
- Owner: 1824: C.Hicks; 1826: Hudson's Bay Company
- Builder: Rye, England
- Cost: £800
- Launched: 1824
- Fate: Wrecked in 1860, on lumber voyage from Puget Sound

General characteristics
- Class & type: Schooner
- Tons burthen: 71, or 7119/94, or 72 (bm)
- Length: 56 ft (17 m)
- Beam: 17 ft (5.2 m)
- Complement: Crew of 35 or 12
- Armament: 6 guns

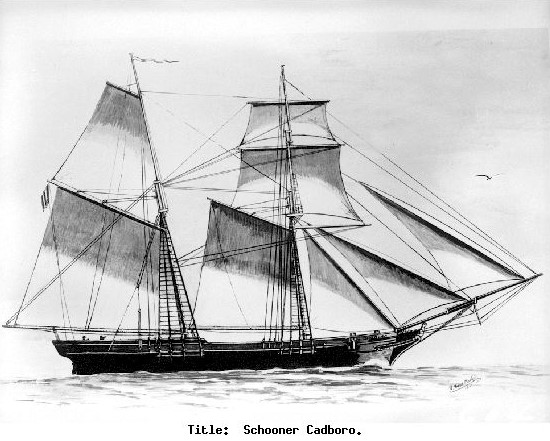
Starboard view of the Schooner Cadboro

Cadboro (or Cadborough) was a schooner launched at Rye, England, in 1824. The Hudson's Bay Company purchased her in 1826 and sold her in 1860. She grounded just north of Port Angeles, WA in October 1862 and was destroyed by pounding surf shortly thereafter.

== Career ==
Cadboro first appeared in Lloyd's Register (LR) in 1824 with T. Rubie, master, C. Hicks, owner, and trade Leith coaster.

In 1826 the Hudson's Bay Company purchased her for £800 for the fur trade from the Pacific Northwest Coast. On 25 September she sailed for the Columbia River in company with another Hudson's Bay Company vessel, William and Ann. Cadboro arrived on the coast in May 1827. From there she sailed north, and then south to Monterey.

Year	Master	Owner	Trade	Source
1826	T.Rubie; J.Swan	C.Hicks	Leith coaster	LR
1827	J.Swan	Hudson's Bay Company	London–Columbia	LR
1830	J.Swan	Hudson's Bay Company	London–Columbia	LR
1837	J.P.Swan			LR

In 1828 the Cadboro was used in an asymmetric use of force by HBC Chief Factor John McLoughlin against the S'Klallam tribe after an earlier raid. In the early morning, under the command of Alexander McCleod, the Cadboro fired its cannons into a village near Port Townsend, killing twenty-seven people and leveling the village.

In 1842 James Douglas (later Sir James Douglas, Governor of the Colonies of Vancouver Island and British Columbia) and six other company staff traveled from Fort Vancouver overland to Fort Nisqually on Puget Sound. Cadboro sailed north to reconnoitre the location of what would become Fort Camosun, shortly afterwards renamed Fort Victoria.

Cadboro was the first vessel to anchor in Cadboro Bay, British Columbia and was the namesake of that bay and the community named for it, and adjoining Cadboro Point.

In 1846, Cadboro was chartered to transport the survivors of the shipwreck of schooner USS Shark to California. She left in January and returned on 17 February 1847.

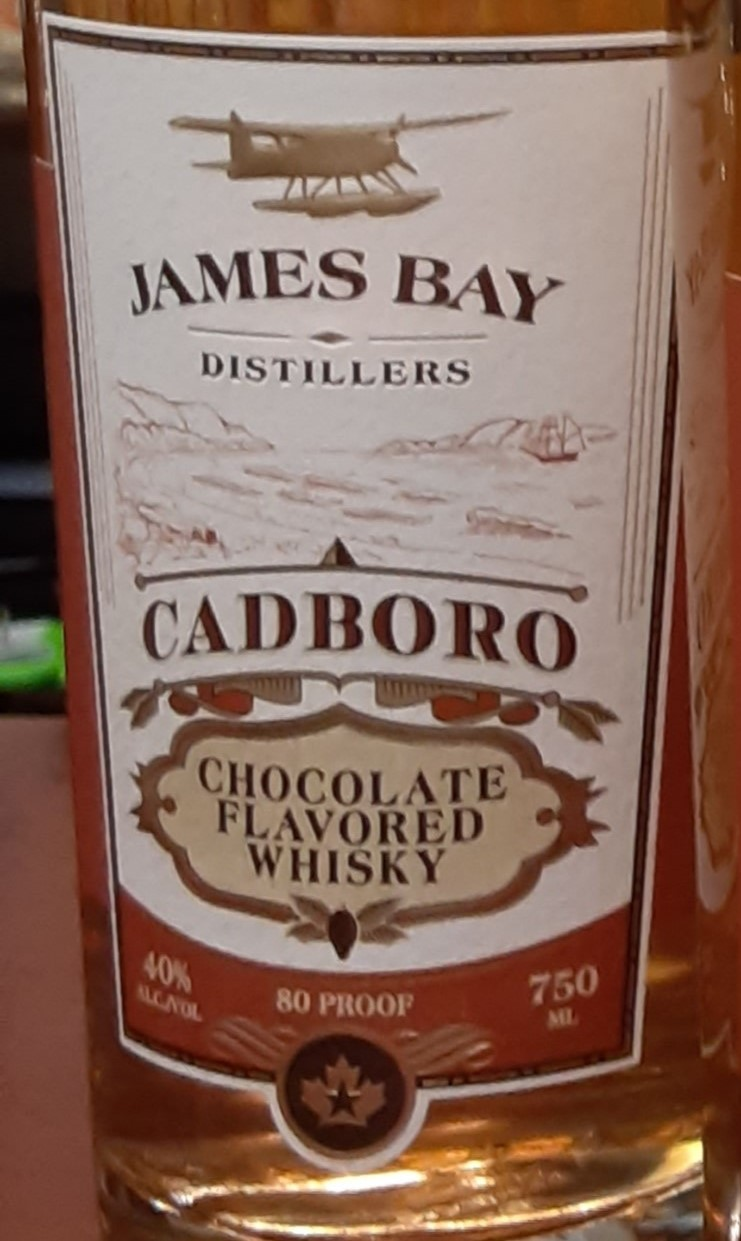
Whisky named for the Schooner Cadboro

In 1850 Cadboro was accused of transporting 10 deserters of the United States. A few days later, she became the first Hudson's Bay Company vessel to be seized by US Customs for non-payment of duties for goods, impounded at Nisqually.

== Fate ==
Cadboro was sold in 1860 to a Captain Howard after being laid up in harbour since 1857. She was later lost in October the same year (or in October 1862), while on a lumber voyage from Puget Sound. The captain successfully beached the ship, but it was destroyed by the surf. The schooner Cadboro is now recalled in the name of a dark-chocolate infused whisky produced by James Bay Distillers of Everett, WA.
