= Uplands, Greater Victoria =

Olmsted-designed neighbourhood in Oak Bay, BC

Coordinates: 48.4485°N 123.3051°W

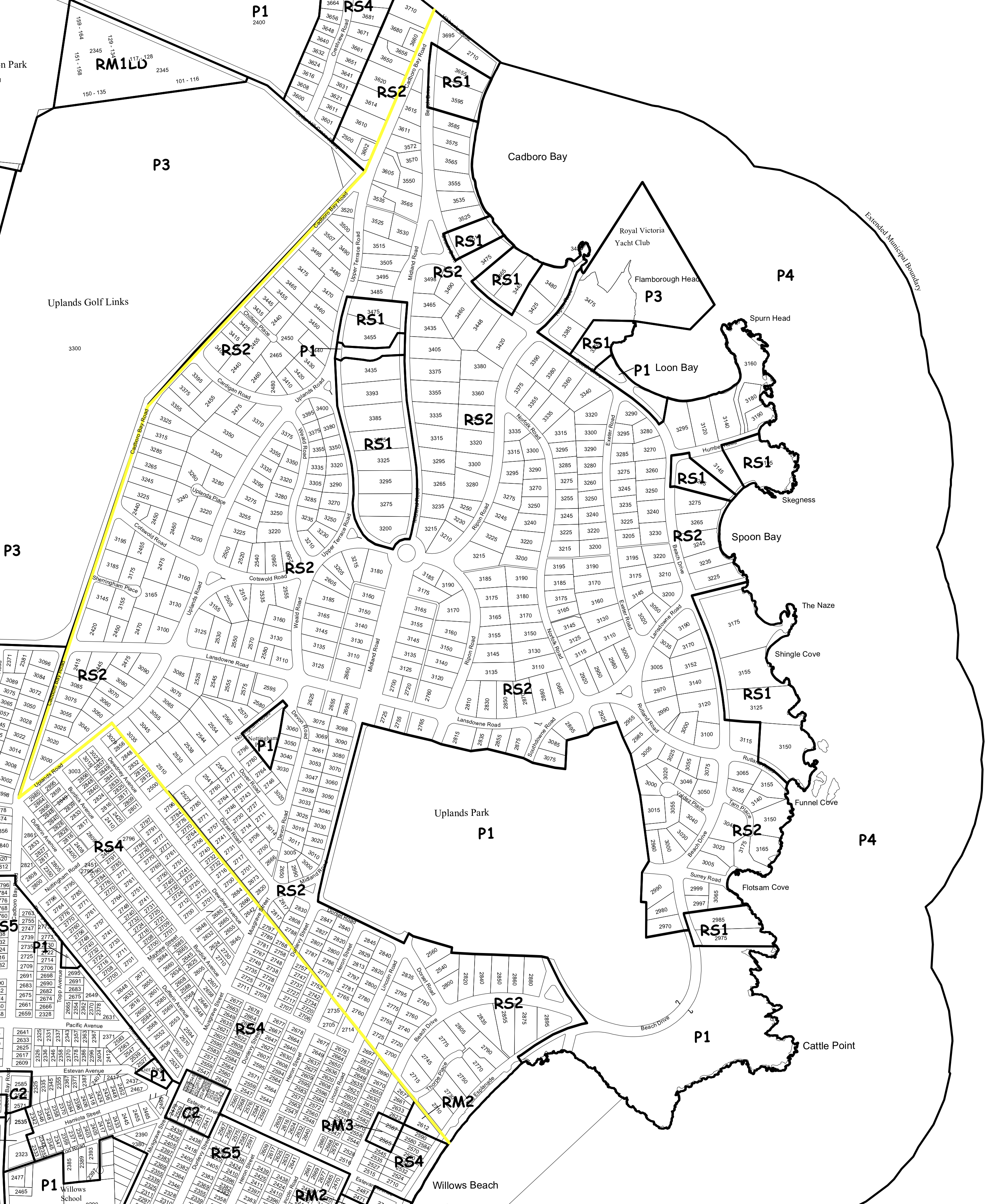
Map of Uplands, where the yellow line indicates the boundary. Source: The Corporation of the District of Oak Bay. “Consolidated Zoning Map, as of November 13, 2012” Bylaw 3531, Zoning Bylaw, 1986.

Uplands, Victoria (known locally as "the Uplands") is a 188.17-hectare (465.0-acre) neighbourhood located in the north east part of the District of Oak Bay, a suburb adjacent to Victoria, British Columbia, Canada, and situated between the neighbourhoods of Cadboro Bay and North Oak Bay. Uplands is a prominent example of a garden suburb designed in the early part of the 20th century.

In 1907, the developers of Uplands, John A, Robert and Dawson Turner previously cattle and horse ranchers from Turner Valley Alberta and originally Scotland purchased the area for the sum of $275,000 and hired the leading landscape architect John Olmsted as the designer. Olmsted designed famous neighbourhoods and parks in North America. The Uplands of today is faithful to Olmsted's vision: an elegant neighbourhood with estate-sized lots, serpentine streets and the signature green, globed, ornate lamp posts. The houses are built to impress and the sprawling gardens are carefully manicured. For John Olmsted personally, of all his subdivision projects, Uplands was “unquestionably the best adapted to obtain the greatest amount of landscape beauty in connection with suburban development.”

Uplands has a seaside setting and has within its boundaries the large Uplands Park. Uplands Park is not the manicured park of flower beds and walks that might be expected in such a meticulously designed garden suburb. Rather, it is a wild, seaside expanse of jagged rock crags, trees stunted and shaped by the wind, lonely heaths and dramatic ocean vistas. The wildness of Uplands Park contrasts sharply with the manicured lawns and flower beds in front of the mansions that line Beach Drive, the main road through Uplands.

In keeping with its seaside location, the Royal Victoria Yacht Club is located within the Uplands, and is the oldest yacht club in British Columbia.

== National Historic Site Designation ==
On 19 August 2019, the minister responsible for Parks Canada announced that the Government of Canada had designated Uplands (Oak Bay, BC) as a National Historic Site. Parks Canada says that Uplands “is an exceptional example of subdivision design and planning”. John C. Olmsted's design is “among the finest works of a renowned landscape architect” which “changed the way suburbs were planned well into the 20th century.” It also notes that a number of the houses in Uplands were designed by Canada's and British Columbia's leading architects.

Oak Bay council voted on 13 October 2020 to install at Midland Circle a commemorative plaque to be provided by Parks Canada, in recognition of Uplands as a National Historic Site.

== Physical environment ==
The bedrock under Uplands is quartz diorite gneiss. Soils are well drained sandy loams of the Cadboro and Langford series (Cd-L or Lsl), or poorly drained sandy clay loams of the Tolmie series (Tscl); all have thick dark topsoils. In near-shore areas the soils are more stony and are mapped as Langford-Rough Stony complex(L-Rs).

Uplands was home to the unique Garry Oak ecosystem, with some small pockets left in parks such as Uplands Park, featuring rare meadows and woodlands with more than 17 endangered species and some of the last remaining deep-soil Garry Oak woodlands. Garry Oak ecosystems can also be understood as "culturally tended foodscapes" with camas as a staple food cultivated by Indigenous peoples who call the region home.
