= Uplands Park =

Public park in Victoria, British Columbia

Coordinates: 48.438545°N 123.294350°W

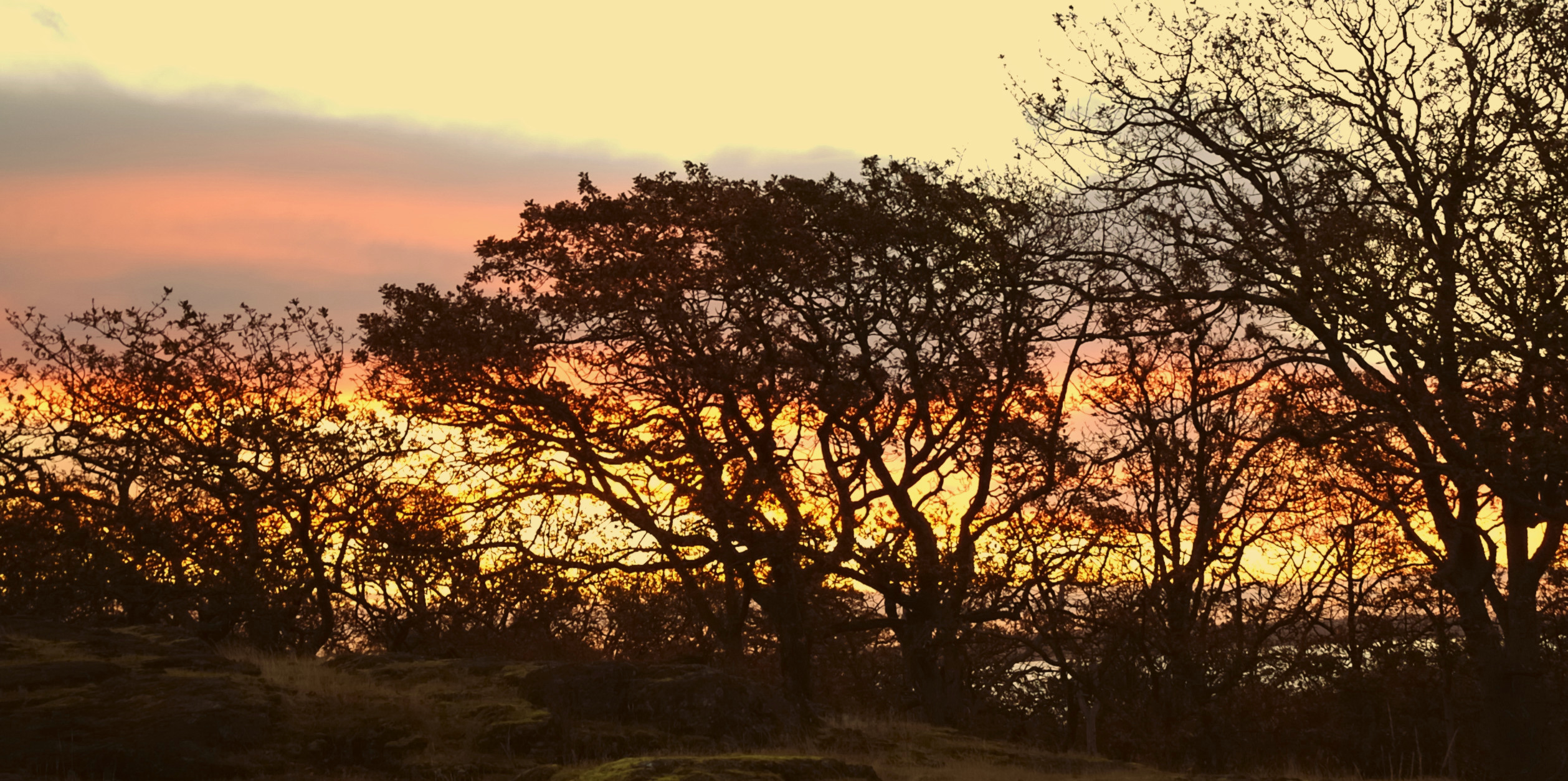
Sunrise Uplands Park

Uplands Park is located within the municipality of Oak Bay, in the Uplands neighborhood, adjacent to the city of Victoria, British Columbia. Uplands Park consists of 76 acres (310,000 m^{2}) of woodland trails and undeveloped natural reserve land, and includes Cattle Point with two well used boat ramps for trailerable boats, as well as the Oak Bay Cenotaph which honours the 97 Oak Bay men and women who died in World War Two.

From 1860 to 1910, cattle were pushed overboard from paddle steamers to swim ashore to what is now Cattle Point, which is where the name Cattle Point comes from.

It is among North America's first natural preserves to be set aside in an urban region; it was established in the 1940s by the Oak Bay city council, under the leadership of Reeve Walter Walker. A cairn, marking Walker's instrumental role in the creation of Uplands Park, stands at Cattle Point, near the southern coastal edge of the park.

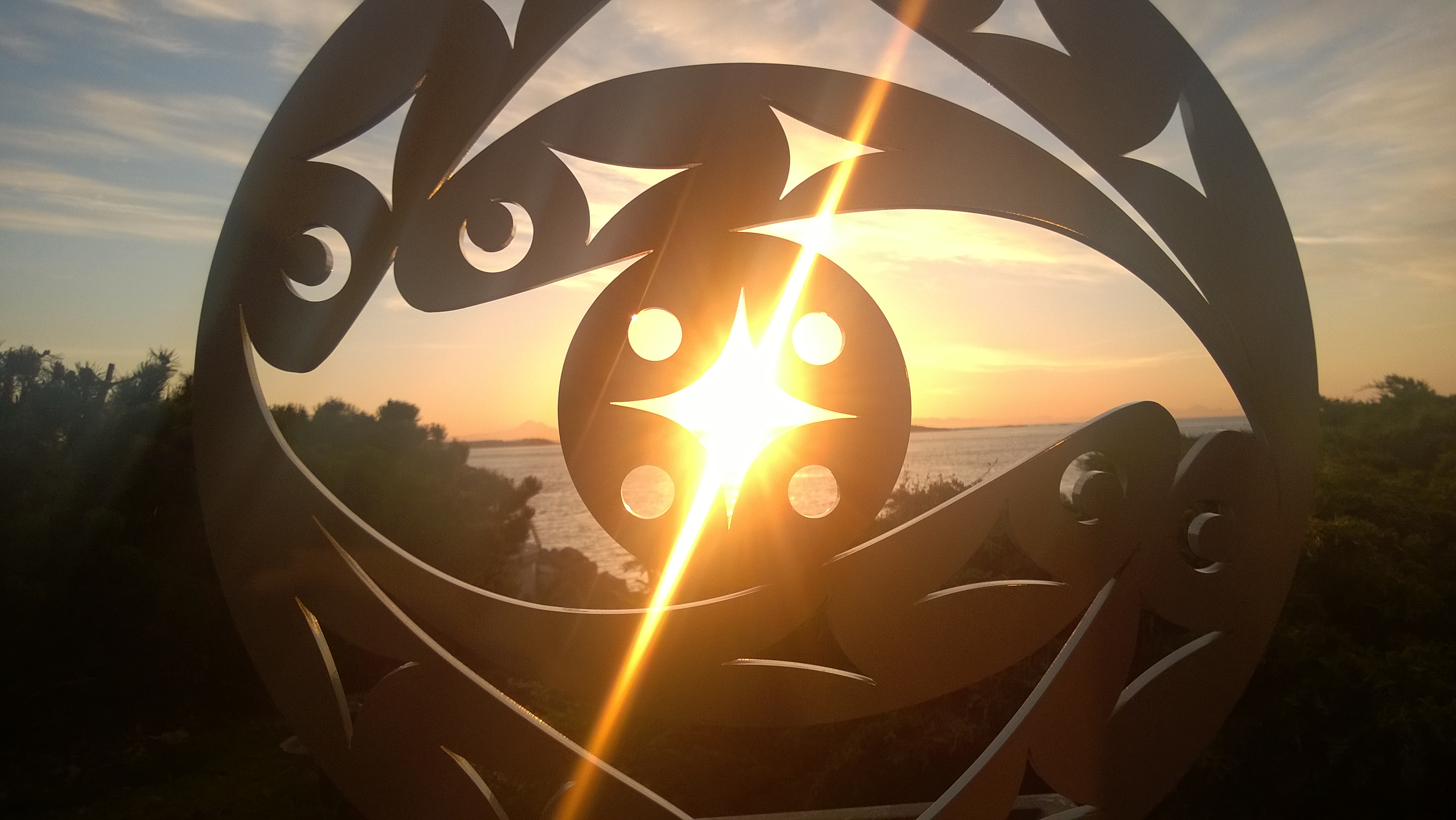
The Salish SUN, part of the Cattle Point orrery

Cattle Point was designated an Urban Star Park in 2013 by the Royal Astronomical Society of Canada, only the second such park in the country. It joins a national and global network of Dark-sky preserves mostly found in remote areas and wilderness which adhere to guidelines to conserve the night sky for astronomical observation.
