= Oak Bay, British Columbia =

Oak Bay
- District municipality
- The Corporation of the District of Oak Bay
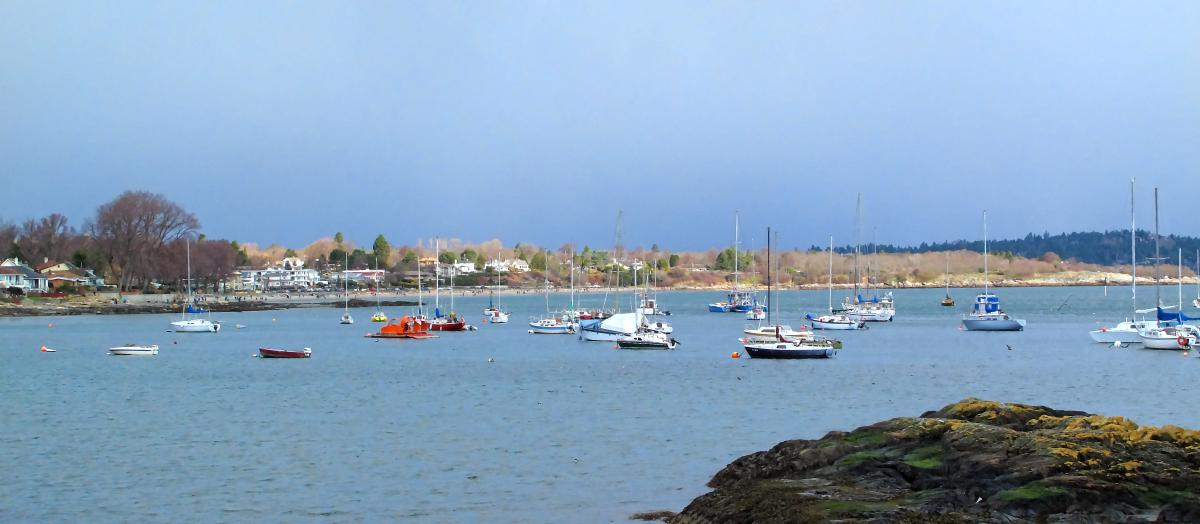

- Coat of arms

- Location of Oak Bay within the Capital Regional District

- Location of Oak Bay in British Columbia
- Coordinates: 48°25′33″N 123°19′05″W
- Country: Canada
- Province: British Columbia
- Regional district: Capital
- Incorporated: 1906

Government
  - Mayor: Kevin Murdoch
  - Governing Body: Oak Bay Municipal Council
  - MP: Will Greaves (Liberal)
  - MLA: Diana Gibson (NDP)

Area
  - Land: 10.52 km^{2} (4.06 sq mi)
- Elevation: 34 m (112 ft)

Population (2021)
  - Total: 17,990
  - Density: 1,710.1/km^{2} (4,429/sq mi)
- Time zone: UTC−07:00 (PT)
- Area codes: 250, 778
- Website: www.oakbay.ca

Oak Bay is a municipality incorporated in 1906 that is located on the southern tip of Vancouver Island, in the Canadian province of British Columbia. It is one of thirteen member municipalities of the Capital Regional District, and is bordered to the west by the city of Victoria and to the north by the district of Saanich. It is a residential suburb of Victoria.

== History ==
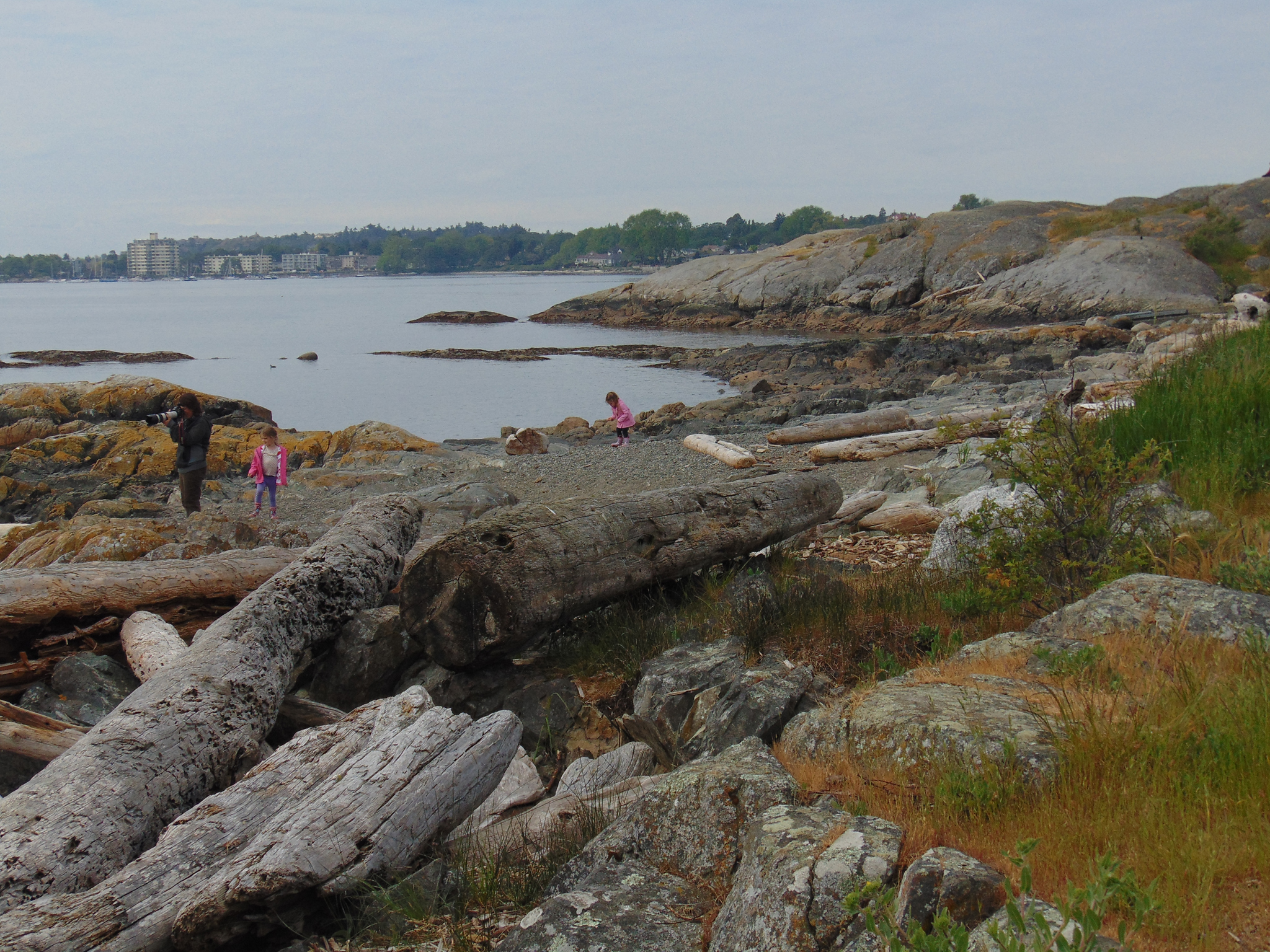
Cattle Point, Oak Bay, British Columbia, Canada

Oak Bay is part of the traditional territories of the Coast Salish people of the Songhees First Nation. Evidence of historic settlement has been found along local shores, including Willows Beach, where an ancient Lkwungen seaport known as Sitchanalth was centred around the mouth of the river commonly known as Bowker Creek. Sitchanalth is hypothesized to have been destroyed by the great Tsunami of 930 AD. Much of this neighbourhood is built upon an Indigenous burial ground.

Oak Bay takes its name from the Garry oak tree, which is found throughout the region, and also the name of the large bay on the eastern shore of the municipality, fronting onto Willows Beach.

John Tod, in 1850, built on a 109-acre (44 ha) farm that is today the oldest continuously-occupied home in Western Canada. Tod was the Chief Fur Trader for the Hudson's Bay Company for Kamloops, one of the original appointed members of BC's Legislative Council.

Originally developed as a middle class streetcar suburb of Victoria, Oak Bay was incorporated as a municipality in 1906. Its first Council included Francis Rattenbury, the architect who designed the Legislative Buildings and Empress Hotel located in Victoria's inner harbour. Rattenbury's own home on Beach Drive is now used as the junior campus for Glenlyon Norfolk School. In 1912, the former farm lands of the Hudson's Bay Company were subdivided to create the Uplands area, but development was hampered by the outbreak of World War I. After the war, development of expensive homes in the Uplands was accompanied by the construction of many more single-family dwellings in the Estevan, Willows and South Oak Bay neighbourhoods.

The Victoria Golf Club is located in South Oak Bay. It was founded in 1893, and is the second oldest golf course west of the Great Lakes. It is a 6,120 yard links course on the ocean side, and claims to be the oldest golf course in Canada still on its original site.

The Royal Victoria Yacht Club was formed on June 8, 1892, and moved in 1912 to its current location, at the location of the old Hudson's Bay Company cattle wharf.

In 1925, the Victoria Cougars won the Stanley Cup at the Patrick Arena in Oak Bay, defeating the Montreal Canadiens in four games. The arena was soon after destroyed by fire in 1929. Nowadays, the Victoria Cougars are the Detroit Red Wings of the National Hockey League.

The Oak Bay Marina, built in 1962, was officially opened in April 1964. It replaced the Oak Bay Boat House built in 1893. The breakwater was built in 1959 and funded by the federal government.

== Geography ==
Neighbourhoods:

- North Oak Bay
- South Oak Bay
- Uplands
- Henderson
- Gonzales
- Estevan

=== Climate ===
Climate data for University of Victoria (Oak Bay / Saanich) WMO ID: 71783; coordinates 48°27′25″N 123°18′17″W; elevation: 60.1 m (197 ft); 1991–2020 normals
Month	Jan	Feb	Mar	Apr	May	Jun	Jul	Aug	Sep	Oct	Nov	Dec	Year
Record high humidex	19.6	16.6	21.9	25.3	31.3	41.9	40.4	35.0	33.4	31.1	20.5	20.9	40.4
Record high °C (°F)	15.2 (59.4)	16.5 (61.7)	21.0 (69.8)	25.0 (77.0)	28.8 (83.8)	37.9 (100.2)	37.6 (99.7)	34.5 (94.1)	30.2 (86.4)	23.5 (74.3)	19.0 (66.2)	16.5 (61.7)	37.6 (99.7)
Mean maximum °C (°F)	12.7 (54.9)	13.2 (55.8)	16.1 (61.0)	20.0 (68.0)	25.4 (77.7)	27.8 (82.0)	30.1 (86.2)	29.8 (85.6)	26.2 (79.2)	19.6 (67.3)	15.0 (59.0)	12.7 (54.9)	31.7 (89.1)
Mean daily maximum °C (°F)	8.2 (46.8)	8.8 (47.8)	11.0 (51.8)	14.0 (57.2)	17.9 (64.2)	20.6 (69.1)	23.7 (74.7)	23.5 (74.3)	20.0 (68.0)	14.3 (57.7)	10.3 (50.5)	8.0 (46.4)	15.0 (59.0)
Daily mean °C (°F)	5.8 (42.4)	5.9 (42.6)	7.5 (45.5)	9.8 (49.6)	12.9 (55.2)	15.4 (59.7)	17.7 (63.9)	17.7 (63.9)	15.0 (59.0)	10.7 (51.3)	7.6 (45.7)	5.5 (41.9)	11.0 (51.8)
Mean daily minimum °C (°F)	3.4 (38.1)	2.9 (37.2)	3.9 (39.0)	5.5 (41.9)	7.9 (46.2)	10.2 (50.4)	11.7 (53.1)	11.8 (53.2)	10.1 (50.2)	7.2 (45.0)	4.7 (40.5)	3.1 (37.6)	6.9 (44.4)
Mean minimum °C (°F)	−2.3 (27.9)	−2.1 (28.2)	−0.8 (30.6)	1.1 (34.0)	3.5 (38.3)	6.5 (43.7)	8.6 (47.5)	8.9 (48.0)	6.1 (43.0)	2.2 (36.0)	−1.2 (29.8)	−2.8 (27.0)	−5.4 (22.3)
Record low °C (°F)	−11.7 (10.9)	−7.2 (19.0)	−4.1 (24.6)	−0.6 (30.9)	0.2 (32.4)	5.1 (41.2)	6.2 (43.2)	7.2 (45.0)	3.6 (38.5)	−2.1 (28.2)	−9.5 (14.9)	−11.2 (11.8)	−11.2 (11.8)
Record low wind chill	−15.4	−11.8	−9.0	−1.7	0.0	0.0	0.0	0.0	0.0	−3.3	−12.4	−14.5	−15.4
Average precipitation mm (inches)	109.6 (4.31)	59.6 (2.35)	52.6 (2.07)	35.6 (1.40)	29.2 (1.15)	19.7 (0.78)	10.7 (0.42)	15.6 (0.61)	30.4 (1.20)	77.2 (3.04)	123.2 (4.85)	97.8 (3.85)	661.2 (26.03)
Average precipitation days (≥ 0.2 mm)	18.7	15.1	17.2	13.2	11.2	9.1	4.8	5.2	11.1	17.8	21.4	19.3	164.0
Average relative humidity (%) (at 1500 LST)	83.3	75.5	70.5	63.8	60.8	58.0	55.5	57.8	65.7	76.6	81.9	82.8	69.3
Average dew point °C (°F)	3.8 (38.8)	3.1 (37.6)	4.1 (39.4)	5.5 (41.9)	8.0 (46.4)	10.0 (50.0)	11.9 (53.4)	12.4 (54.3)	11.1 (52.0)	8.4 (47.1)	5.6 (42.1)	3.6 (38.5)	7.3 (45.1)
Source 1: Environment and Climate Change Canada
Source 2: weatherstats.ca (for dewpoint and monthly&yearly average absolute maximum&minimum temperature)

Climate data for Gonzales Avenue, Victoria, British Columbia, Canada (1971-2000)
Month	Jan	Feb	Mar	Apr	May	Jun	Jul	Aug	Sep	Oct	Nov	Dec	Year
Record high humidex	13.8	16.0	18.3	22.4	29.1	33.8	36.1	35.0	32.3	24.7	19.7	15.1	36.1
Record high °C (°F)	14.4 (57.9)	17.4 (63.3)	20.6 (69.1)	27.0 (80.6)	29.5 (85.1)	35.0 (95.0)	35.0 (95.0)	32.8 (91.0)	31.7 (89.1)	25.0 (77.0)	18.9 (66.0)	15.0 (59.0)	35.0 (95.0)
Mean daily maximum °C (°F)	7.0 (44.6)	8.6 (47.5)	10.6 (51.1)	13.1 (55.6)	15.9 (60.6)	17.9 (64.2)	19.8 (67.6)	20.1 (68.2)	18.5 (65.3)	13.8 (56.8)	9.4 (48.9)	7.1 (44.8)	13.5 (56.3)
Daily mean °C (°F)	5.0 (41.0)	6.2 (43.2)	7.6 (45.7)	9.6 (49.3)	12.1 (53.8)	14.0 (57.2)	15.6 (60.1)	15.9 (60.6)	14.6 (58.3)	10.9 (51.6)	7.2 (45.0)	5.2 (41.4)	10.3 (50.6)
Mean daily minimum °C (°F)	3.0 (37.4)	3.7 (38.7)	4.5 (40.1)	6.0 (42.8)	8.2 (46.8)	10.0 (50.0)	11.3 (52.3)	11.7 (53.1)	10.7 (51.3)	7.9 (46.2)	5.0 (41.0)	3.2 (37.8)	7.1 (44.8)
Record low °C (°F)	−14.4 (6.1)	−12.8 (9.0)	−7.2 (19.0)	−2.2 (28.0)	1.1 (34.0)	3.9 (39.0)	6.1 (43.0)	4.4 (39.9)	1.7 (35.1)	−2.8 (27.0)	−11.1 (12.0)	−15.6 (3.9)	−15.6 (3.9)
Record low wind chill	−22.0	−19.0	−14.0	−5.0	−2.0	3.0	4.0	7.0	1.0	−9.0	−21.0	−27.0	−27.0
Average precipitation mm (inches)	94.3 (3.71)	71.7 (2.82)	46.5 (1.83)	28.5 (1.12)	25.8 (1.02)	20.7 (0.81)	14.0 (0.55)	19.7 (0.78)	27.4 (1.08)	51.2 (2.02)	98.9 (3.89)	108.9 (4.29)	607.6 (23.92)
Average rainfall mm (inches)	85.2 (3.35)	68.1 (2.68)	45.3 (1.78)	28.5 (1.12)	25.8 (1.02)	20.7 (0.81)	14.0 (0.55)	19.7 (0.78)	27.4 (1.08)	51.1 (2.01)	95.5 (3.76)	101.9 (4.01)	583.2 (22.95)
Average snowfall cm (inches)	9.7 (3.8)	3.5 (1.4)	1.1 (0.4)	0 (0)	0 (0)	0 (0)	0 (0)	0 (0)	0 (0)	0.1 (0.0)	4.1 (1.6)	7.8 (3.1)	26.3 (10.3)
Average precipitation days (≥ 0.2 mm)	17.0	15.4	14.5	10.8	9.6	7.9	5.1	5.2	8.0	13.5	17.4	17.5	141.9
Average rainy days (≥ 0.2 mm)	14.6	14.3	12.9	10.5	9.0	7.1	4.9	4.8	7.9	11.9	15.3	16.1	129.3
Average snowy days (≥ 0.2 cm)	2.6	1.7	0.67	0	0	0	0	0	0	0.12	0.82	1.9	7.81
Mean monthly sunshine hours	74.1	93.7	149.5	201.5	266.6	273.8	327.8	297.3	204.1	153.4	83.1	68.7	2,193.6
Source: Environment Canada

== Demographics ==
In the 2021 Census of Population conducted by Statistics Canada, Oak Bay had a population of 17,990 living in 7,807 of its 8,168 total private dwellings, a change of −0.6% from its 2016 population of 18,094. With a land area of 10.52 km^{2} (4.06 sq mi), it had a population density of 1,710.1/km^{2} (4,429.1/sq mi) in 2021.

Historical census populations – Oak Bay, British Columbia

Year	Pop.	±%
1941	9,240	—
1951	11,960	+29.4%
1956	14,857	+24.2%
1961	16,935	+14.0%
1966	18,123	+7.0%
1971	18,426	+1.7%

Year	Pop.	±%
1976	17,658	−4.2%
1981	16,990	−3.8%
1986	17,065	+0.4%
1991	17,815	+4.4%
1996	17,865	+0.3%
2001	17,798	−0.4%

Year	Pop.	±%
2006	17,908	+0.6%
2011	18,015	+0.6%
2016	18,094	+0.4%
2021	17,990	−0.6%

Population counts are not adjusted for boundary changes.
Source: Statistics Canada

=== Ethnicity ===
Panethnic groups in the District of Oak Bay (1996−2021)
Panethnic group	2021		2016		2011		2006		2001		1996	
Panethnic group	Pop.	%	Pop.	%	Pop.	%	Pop.	%	Pop.	%	Pop.	%
European (Note: Statistic includes all persons that did not make up part of a visible minority or an indigenous identity.)	15,040	85.26%	15,355	87.87%	15,515	89.24%	16,200	91.6%	16,030	91.68%	16,240	92.3%
East Asian (Note: Statistic includes total responses of "Chinese", "Korean", and "Japanese" under visible minority section on census.)	1,110	6.29%	1,080	6.18%	810	4.66%	645	3.65%	1,000	5.72%	845	4.8%
South Asian	370	2.1%	285	1.63%	325	1.87%	180	1.02%	120	0.69%	205	1.17%
Indigenous	345	1.96%	255	1.46%	190	1.09%	260	1.47%	120	0.69%	90	0.51%
Southeast Asian (Note: Statistic includes total responses of "Filipino" and "Southeast Asian" under visible minority section on census.)	250	1.42%	190	1.09%	155	0.89%	185	1.05%	75	0.43%	10	0.06%
Latin American	120	0.68%	95	0.54%	45	0.26%	65	0.37%	45	0.26%	35	0.2%
Middle Eastern (Note: Statistic includes total responses of "West Asian" and "Arab" under visible minority section on census.)	115	0.65%	115	0.66%	85	0.49%	80	0.45%	10	0.06%	80	0.45%
African	100	0.57%	55	0.31%	60	0.35%	25	0.14%	70	0.4%	85	0.48%
Other/multiracial (Note: Statistic includes total responses of "Visible minority, n.i.e." and "Multiple visible minorities" under visible minority section on census.)	180	1.02%	45	0.26%	75	0.43%	35	0.2%	20	0.11%	10	0.06%
Total responses	17,640	98.05%	17,475	96.58%	17,385	96.5%	17,685	98.75%	17,485	98.24%	17,595	98.49%
Total population	17,990	100%	18,094	100%	18,015	100%	17,908	100%	17,798	100%	17,865	100%
Note: Totals greater than 100% due to multiple origin responses.

=== Religion ===
According to the 2021 census, religious groups in Oak Bay included:

- Irreligion (10,250 persons or 58.1%)
- Christianity (6,430 persons or 36.5%)
- Judaism (260 persons or 1.5%)
- Buddhism (170 persons or 1.0%)
- Sikhism (120 persons or 0.7%)
- Islam (85 persons or 0.5%)
- Hinduism (50 persons or 0.3%)
- Other (280 persons or 1.6%)

== Film studio ==
During the 1930s, Oak Bay was dubbed "Hollywood North." Fourteen films were produced in Greater Victoria between 1933 and 1938. In 1932 Kenneth James Bishop leased an off-season exhibition building on the Willows Fairgrounds that was converted to a film sound stage to produce films for the British film quota system under the Cinematograph Films Act 1927 and films were produced with Hollywood stars such as Lillian Gish, Paul Muni, Cedric Hardwicke, Edith Fellows, Charles Starrett and Rin Tin Tin Jr. Film production was curtailed when the Cinematograph Films Act 1938 specified only British made films would be included in the quota.

The Willows Park Studio films include:

- The Crimson Paradise (1933; "Fighting Playboy" in the US) (The first all talking motion picture in Canada.)
- Secrets of Chinatown (1935; Production Company was Commonwealth Productions Ltd. based on the out of print book The Black Robe by Guy Morton. Kathleen Dunsmuir invested $50,000 in the film. Before completion of the film Commonwealth Productions went bankrupt, Northern Films Ltd. completed post production of the film, Kathleen Dunsmuir lost all $50,000. The film is technically British it received British film registration number br. 11391. The film was seized by the police at request of the Chinese Consul with the claim it was offensive, the film was altered before its release. In Victoria Harry Hewitson the actor playing Chan Tow Ling would remind the audience with the warning it was fictional. In addition to Chinatown and surrounding downtown Victoria the Gonzales area is used in outdoor shots of the film.)
- Fury and the Woman (1936, aka Lucky Corrigan)
- Lucky Fugitives (1936)
- Secret Patrol (1936)
- Stampede (1936)
- Tugboat Princess (1936)
- What Price Vengeance? (1937)
- Manhattan Shakedown (1937)
- Murder is News (1937)
- Woman Against the World (1937)
- Death Goes North (1937)
- Convicted (1938)
- Special Inspector (1938)
- Commandos Strike at Dawn (1942)

== Parks ==
- Anderson Hill Park - The Vancouver Island Trail's southern terminus is located here
- Uplands Park / Cattle Point (a Garry oak ecosystem).
- Willows Beach

== Public safety ==
- Oak Bay Emergency Program
- Oak Bay Fire Department - The Oak Bay Fire Department was formed in 1937.
- Oak Bay Police Department - The Oak Bay Police Department was formed in 1906.
- Oak Bay Sea Rescue (OBSR) - Royal Canadian Marine Search and Rescue Station 33 (RCM-SAR) - Oak Bay Sea Rescue was formed in 1977, and is a volunteer organisation. The Unit's Boats are based out of Oak Bay Marina

== Education ==
Oak Bay is the home of the University of Victoria, a public research institution in the Capital Region District. While much of the University of Victoria campus is located within the District of Oak Bay, parts of it are also located in the adjacent municipality of Saanich.

Oak Bay also hosts a number of academically focused public and private secondary schools which are part of School District 61. There is one public elementary school, Willows Elementary, one public middle school, Monterey Middle School, and one public high school, Oak Bay High School, with the largest student population in the Greater Victoria School District. Residents in the South Oak Bay area may also register their children at the nearby Margaret Jenkins Elementary (in Victoria). In addition to public schools, there are two private schools located in Oak Bay, Glenlyon Norfolk School and St. Michael's University School.

== See also ==
- McNeill Bay (British Columbia)
