= Cadborosaurus =

Sea monster named for Cadboro Bay in Canada

Cadborosaurus, nicknamed Caddy by journalist Archie Wills, is a sea serpent in regional folklore of the Pacific Coast of North America. Its name is derived from Cadboro Bay in Victoria, British Columbia, and the Greek word saûros (σαῦρος) meaning lizard or reptile.

== Description ==
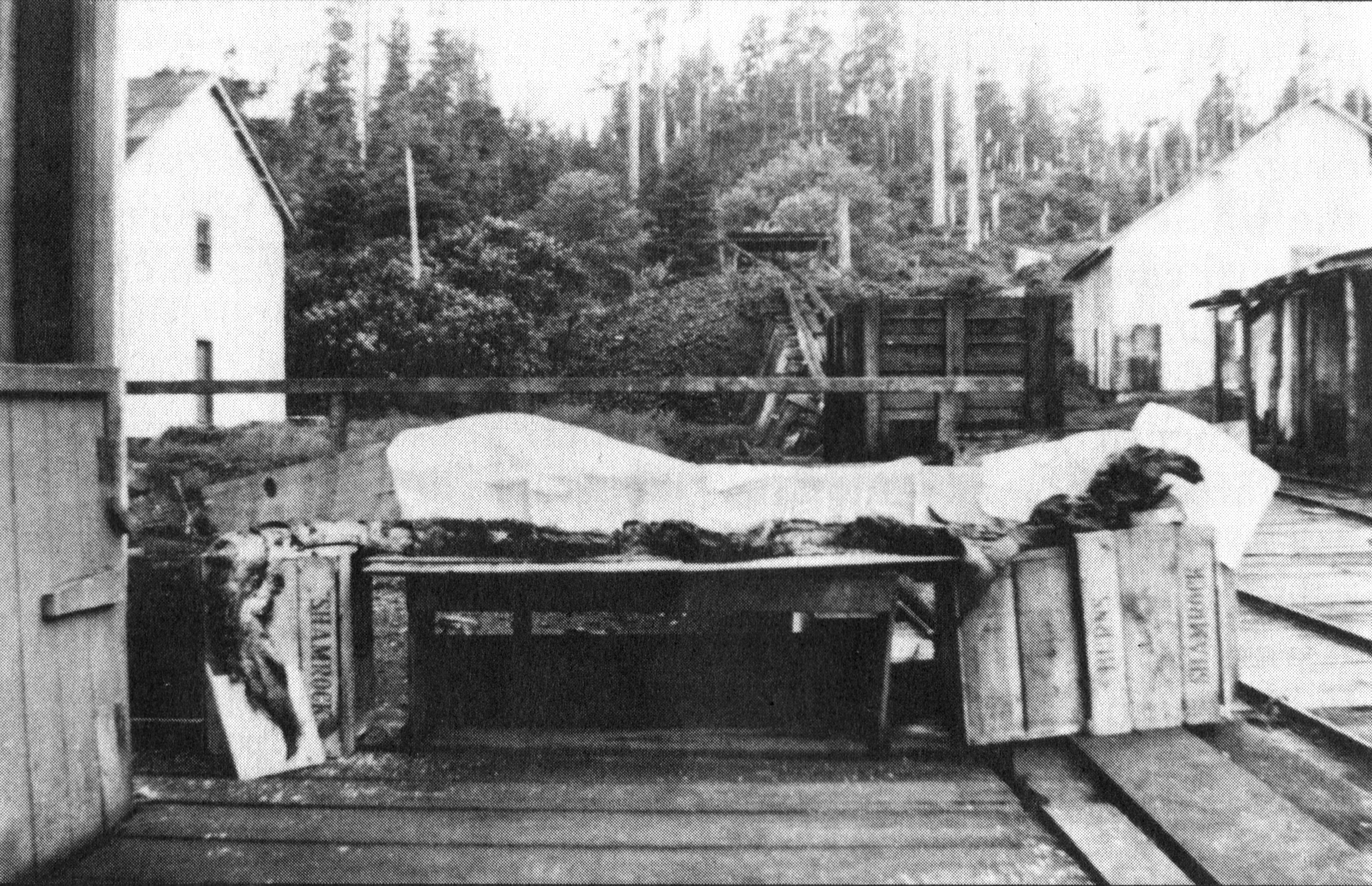
Side view of the Naden Harbour carcass

Cadborosaurus willsi is said by witnesses to resemble a serpent with vertical coils or humps in tandem behind a horse-like head and long neck, with a pair of small elevating front flippers, and either a pair of hind flippers or a pair of large, webbed hind flippers fused to form a large fan-like tail region that provides forward propulsion.

Paul LeBlond, director of Earth and Ocean sciences at UBC, and Edward Blousfield, retired chief zoologist of the Canadian Museum of Nature, note the diverse array of elongated animals that have been put forward as an explanation for Caddy, including Conger eels, humpback whales, elephant seals, ribbon or oarfish, basking sharks, and sea lions. LeBlond and Blousfield state that no known creature matches the characteristics found in over 200 sightings collected over a century, noting that Caddy is described as having flippers both anteriorly and posteriorly. Darren Naish contends that LeBlond and Blousfield are engaging in "bad science" and have incorrectly assumed that different, conflicting eyewitness reports are all descriptions of one species when various accounts "are most parsimoniously interpreted as descriptions of many things".

== Creatures identified as Cadborosaurus ==
=== Sea lion ===
In 1943, two police officers, Inspector Robert Owens, and Staff Sergeant Jack Russell, saw a "huge sea serpent with a horse-like head" in the Georgia Strait. Later, "with a pair of binoculars, Sgt. Russell saw that the strange apparition was a huge bull sea lion leading a herd of six sea lions... Their undulations as they swam appeared to form a continuous body, with parts showing at intervals as they surfaced and dived. To the naked eye, the sight perfectly impersonated a sea monster."

=== Giant oarfish ===
Some suggestions have been made that Caddy could be an example of the king of herrings or giant oarfish (Regalecus glesne). This species can reach 11 m (36 feet) in length and weigh up to 272 kg (600 pounds). In the opinion of some marine biologists, these long, silvery fish could be mistaken for a sea serpent given the writhing motions they make as they swim.

=== Basking shark ===
Decomposing basking sharks may resemble a "pseudo-plesiosaur carcass", and a similar creature caught off the coast of Japan in 1977 was found to be a dead basking shark.

== First Nations accounts ==
A native image that fits Caddy's description has been traditionally used throughout Alaska. The image indicates that Caddy or a Caddy-like creature moves north from Vancouver when the waters warm. The Inuit of Alaska have even put the picture on their canoes to keep the creature away. The Cadborosaurus is called hiyitl'iik by the Manhousaht people who live on Sydney Inlet, t'chain-ko in Sechelt mythology, and numkse lee kwala by the K'ómoks band of Vancouver Island. However, it has also been argued that these Native stories reflect a diversity of different animals (some mythical, some real) and to prematurely conflate them with Cadborosaurus ignores their diverse origins and often independent backgrounds.

== Sightings ==
There have been more than 300 claimed sightings during the past 200 years, including Deep Cove in Saanich Inlet, and Island View Beach, both of which are also on the Saanich Peninsula, and at San Francisco Bay, California.

=== Kelly Nash video ===
In 2009, fisherman Kelly Nash purportedly filmed several minutes of footage featuring ten to fifteen (including young) creatures in Nushagak Bay. In 2011, a very short segment of the footage was shown on the Discovery TV show Hilstranded, where the Hilstrand brothers (from Deadliest Catch) apparently saw Nash's footage and unsuccessfully attempted to find one of the creatures.

== Carcasses associated with Cadborosaurus ==
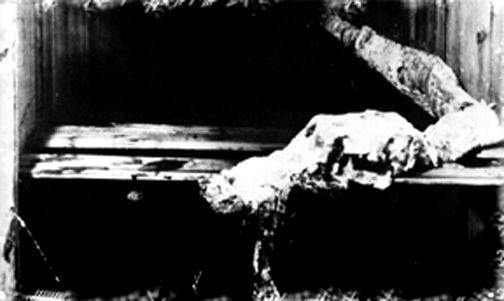
The Effingham Carcass, Vancouver Island, 1947; supposed remains of "Caddy"

- 1930: On 10 November at Glacier Island near Valdez, a skeleton was found in ice. The skeleton was 24 feet (7.3 m) long with flippers. Some of the remains were preserved in Cordova for scientific study. The creature is thought to have been a whale.
- 1934: On Henry Island near Prince Rupert, badly decomposed remains about 30 feet (9.1 m) long were found in the month of November. Marine biologist Neal Carter examined the remains. The creature was ultimately identified as a basking shark.
- 1937: In October, a purported Cadborosaurus carcass was retrieved from the stomach of a sperm whale in Naden Harbour and photographed. A sample of this carcass was sent to the BC Provincial Museum, where it was tentatively identified as a fetal baleen whale by museum director Francis Kermode.
- 1941: A carcass called "Sarah the sea hag" was found on Kitsilano Beach. W. A. Clemens and Ian McTaggart-Cowan identified it as a shark.
- 1947: In December at Vernon Bay, Barkley Sound, Vancouver Island, a 45-foot (14 m) creature was found. It was identified as a shark.
- 1950: In Delake, Oregon, a creature was found with 4 tails and thick hair. It was identified as a whale shark.
- 1956: Somewhere near Dry Harbour, south of Yakutat, Alaska, a 100-foot-long (30 m) carcass was found with 2-inch-long (5.1 cm) hair. Trevor Kincaid is quoted as saying that the "description fits no known creature". W. A. Clemens identified the carcass as a Baird's beaked whale.
- 1962: In April near Ucluelet, a 14-foot-long (4.3 m) carcass was found with an elephant-like head. The carcass was dragged ashore by an individual named Simon Peter and later thought to be an elephant seal.
- 1963: In September near Oak Harbor, Whidbey Island, a carcass was found with a head resembling a horse. A. D. Welander of Fisheries thought it was a basking shark.

== Purported live capture ==
- 1968: In August, W. Hagelund claimed to have caught a baby Caddy near De Courcy Island, only to return it to the water.
- 1991: In July, on Johns Island (San Juan Islands), Phyllis Harsh claimed to have caught a small, 2-foot (60 cm) baby Caddy and returned it to the water.

== Bibliography ==
- Bousfield, E. L., & P. H. LeBlond (1995). "An account of Cadborosaurus willsi, new genus, new species, a large aquatic reptile from the Pacific coast of North America". Amphipacifica Vol 1 Suppl. 1: pp. 1–25, 19 figs.
- Jupp, Ursula. (1988, reprinted 1993). Cadboro: A Ship, A Bay, A Sea-Monster. Jay Editions.
